= Jane Osbourn =

British biotechnologist

Jane Osbourn OBE
- Born: Jane Katharine Osbourn; Bingley, West Yorkshire, England
- Citizenship: United Kingdom
- Education: Bingley Grammar School; Queens' College, Cambridge (BSc); John Innes Centre, Norwich (PhD)
- Known for: Antibody engineering Cambridge Antibody Technology; MedImmune; AstraZeneca; STEM
- Scientific career
- Fields: Biotechnology
- Thesis: Evidence that nucleocapsid disassembly and a later step in virus replication are inhibited in transgenic tobacco protoplasts expressing TMV coat protein (1991)
- Doctoral advisor: T. Michael A. Wilson

Jane Osbourn, OBE, is a scientist and former chair of the UK BioIndustry Association.

A Natural Sciences graduate of Queens' College, Cambridge, Osbourn completed several post-graduate qualifications before moving into industry at Cambridge Antibody Technology, that became MedImmune and AstraZeneca.

In the Queen's Birthday Honours list of 2019, Osbourn was appointed as an Officer of the Order of the British Empire (OBE) for services to "Human Monoclonal Antibody Drug Research and Development and Biotechnology".

== Early life ==
Osbourn was born in Bingley, West Yorkshire, and attended Bingley Grammar School. She is married to John Richer, Professor of Physics at the Cavendish Laboratory, Cambridge.

She is the sister of Professor Anne Osbourn FRS who investigates plant natural product biosynthesis.

== Academic career ==
Osbourn went on to study at the Queens' College, Cambridge, where she obtained a 1st class degree in Natural Sciences (Biochemistry). She was recognised in 1986 for playing netball at Queens, and was awarded both a third year Foundation Scholarship and The Henry Mosseri prize.

She went on to complete a PhD degree at the John Innes Centre for Plant Science Research in Norwich, which resulted in the publication of Evidence that nucleocapsid disassembly and a later step in virus replication are inhibited in transgenic tobacco protoplasts expressing TMV coat protein. Following this, she completed a post-doctoral position at Rutgers University, New Jersey, United States, undertaking research directed towards clarification of the sequence elements responsible for the translational enhancement effect conferred by the 5' untranslated region of Tobacco Mosaic Virus known as omega.

Osbourn then moved into medical research through a British Heart Foundation Post-Doctoral Fellowship at the Department of Medicine at Addenbrooke's Hospital in Cambridge.

== Career in industry ==
In 1993 she moved to a small, Cambridge-based, start-up biotechnology company called Cambridge Antibody Technology. CAT, as it was called, would pioneer the use of Phage Display technology that ultimately discovered important drugs such as Humira.

She was the key author of several scientific papers, including Human Antibodies with Sub-nanomolar Affinities Isolated from a Large Non-immunized Phage Display Library, Nature Biotechnology, 1996 and Human Antibodies by Design, Nature Biotechnology, 1998. She is co-author of several others pertaining to antibody discovery and development:

- A Biparatopic HER2-Targeting Antibody-Drug Conjugate Induces Tumor Regression in Primary Models Refractory to or Ineligible for HER2-Targeted Therapy, Cancer Cell, 2019
- Engineering of a GLP-1 analogue peptide/anti-PCSK9 antibody fusion for type 2 diabetes treatment, Sci Rep, 2018
- A novel in vivo method for isolating antibodies from a phage display library by neuronal retrograde transport selectively yields antibodies against p75(NTR.), MAbs, 2013
- Applications of ribosome display to antibody drug discovery, Expert Opin Biol Ther, 2015
- Signal amplification in flow cytometry using biotin tyramine, Cytometry, 1999
- Aquaporin-1 is expressed by vascular smooth muscle cells and mediates rapid water transport across vascular cell membranes, J Vasc Res, 1999
- Directed selection of MIP-1 alpha neutralizing CCR5 antibodies from a phage display human antibody library, Nat Biotechnology, 1999
- Pathfinder selection: in situ isolation of novel antibodies, Immunotechnology, 1998
- Generation of a panel of related human scFv antibodies with high affinities for human CEA, Immunotechnology, 1996

Osbourn is listed as an inventor on several patents, which are (in chronological order):

- EP0865492B1 - Specific binding members for human carcinoembryonic antigen, materials and methods
- EP0906571 - Labelling and selection of molecules
- US5994519A - Labelling and selection of molecules
- EP1353180B1 - Labelling and selection of molecules
- US7074557 - Ribosome Display
- EP1268766 - Improvements to Ribosome Display
- WO2001075097A2 - Improvements to Ribosome Display

Osbourn also created a technique to assist with the discovery of proximity-guided selection of antibodies, so called Proximol.

CAT was acquired by AstraZeneca in 2006 and in the following year was merged with a US-based company called MedImmune to form AstraZeneca’s global biologics R&D arm. During this time Osbourn began to speak about opportunities for diversity in science.

In 2013, AstraZeneca announced its decision to relocate its headquarters to Cambridge, UK. Jonathan Burroughs, of Creative Places, wrote in 2015 that Osbourn had an influence over this decision.

In February 2019, it was announced that Osbourn would be leaving AstraZeneca. Since November 2019, Osbourn has been Chief Scientific Officer (CSO) of antibody therapeutics discovery company Alchemab Therapeutics.

== Recognition ==
Her early interest in science has grown into a passion for science education, supporting and championing life science education programmes and she is established as an advisor and mentor to many young researchers in the life science sector. She has been acknowledged by a number of different pharmaceutical media groups for these qualities.

- She has been recognised in two BioBeat Movers and Shakers lists - BioBeat 50 Movers and Shakers in BioBusiness 2014 and 2016. BioBeat is an organisation that connects entrepreneurs with the leaders in biotech.
- In 2016 she was recognised in the PharmaVoice 100 researchers and scientists. PharmaVOICE is a resource for life-sciences executives and other healthcare-service related professionals
- In 2016, Fierce Pharma’s “Fierce Women in Biopharma” recognised her as one of 15 women in the global industry noteworthy for their leadership, providing mentorship and helping increase opportunities for women in science. FierceBiotech and its family of publications provide end-to-end coverage of biotech and medtech, from pre-clinical science through clinical testing and regulatory approval.

In 2014 Osbourn was elected to join the board of the BioIndustry Association, becoming Chair in 2016; and in this role she has been working to support the development of the biotechnology sector in the UK. She also does this through her roles as a Director of Babraham Bioscience Technologies and as a Director of Cambridge Enterprise, the technology transfer organisation for University of Cambridge.

Osbourn has presented at a number of parliamentary Select Committees. At the Business, Innovation and Skills Committee, on Tuesday 13 May 2014, she gave evidence on behalf of AstraZeneca as it faced a potential takeover from Pfizer.

On 1 July that year, Osbourn gave evidence to the Science and Technology Select Committee: Priorities for Scientific Research.

Osbourn has also previously served as a Member of the UK Medical Research Council Industry Grant Award Assessment Panel.

In 2018 the Nobel Prize for Chemistry was awarded jointly to Sir Greg Winter, George Smith and Frances Arnold. Winter received his award for the phage display of peptides and antibodies. Sir Greg and David Chiswell had founded Cambridge Antibody Technology to exploit this science. Osbourn says of this time, "There was a cohort of really able intellect in Cambridge – in CAT and other companies, in the MRC LMB and in the University – and what happened was a condensation of that focus… Once we decided to make phage display work, we set some really tough goals and then just got on with it." To recognise Jane’s contribution to the prize, she, along with David Chiswell and John McCafferty, accompanied Sir Greg to the Nobel ceremony.

On 7 June 2019 she was appointed as an Officer of the Order of the British Empire (OBE) for services to Human Monoclonal Antibody Drug Research and Development and Biotechnology. CEO of AstraZeneca, Pascal Soriot, said of the award "On behalf of AstraZeneca, I am delighted to congratulate Dr Jane Osbourn for her award of an OBE in recognition of her services to human monoclonal antibody drug research and development and biotechnology. This well-deserved honour reflects her contribution to biopharmaceutical science over more than 25 years, from Cambridge Antibody Technology to AstraZeneca and MedImmune. Jane’s leadership in UK life sciences includes championing the biotech sector through her position as chair of the BIA and contributing to the growth of the UK’s scientific ecosystem. I would also like to recognise her authentic commitment to building skills through STEM and education outreach, in particular for women in science".

Osbourn was elected a Fellow of the Academy of Medical Sciences in 2021. In 2025, Cambridge Independent Science and Technology awarded Osbourn the Lifetime Achievement Award.
