= Cambridge Antibody Technology =

British biotechnology company (1989–2007)

Cambridge Antibody Technology Group Plc
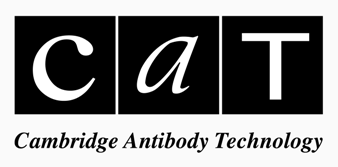
- Type: Private
- Traded as: LSE: CAT Nasdaq: CATG
- Industry: Biopharmaceutical
- Founded: 1989; 37 years ago (Daly Laboratories, Babraham)
- Founder: David Chiswell, Sir Greg Winter, John McCafferty, Medical Research Council
- Defunct: 2007
- Fate: Acquired by AstraZeneca in 2006; combined with MedImmune in 2007
- Successor: MedImmune
- Headquarters: Granta Park, Cambridgeshire, England
- Area served: Worldwide
- Key people: David Chiswell (CEO 1996–2002); Peter Chambré (CEO 2003–2006)
- Products: Adalimumab, discovery of; belimumab discovery of
- Services: Therapeutic monoclonal antibody discovery and development
- Revenue: £172.50m (six months ending 31 March 2006*)
- Operating income: £147.25m (six months ending 31 March 2006*)
- Net income: £25.25m (six months ending 31 March 2006*)
- Total assets: £215.98m (six months ending 31 March 2006*)
- Total equity: £180.97m (six months ending 31 March 2006*)
- Owner: AstraZeneca
- Number of employees: Approximately 300 (2006)
- Footnotes; *Financials for six-month period prior to acquisition by AstraZeneca were distorted by the settlement for royalties payable on Adalimumab sales

Cambridge Antibody Technology Group Plc, (commonly referred to as CAT) was a biotechnology company headquartered in Cambridge, England. Its core focus was on antibody therapeutics, primarily using Phage Display and Ribosome Display technology.

Phage Display Technology was used by CAT to create adalimumab, the first fully human antibody blockbuster drug. Humira, the brand name of adalimumab, is an anti-TNF antibody discovered by CAT as D2E7, then developed in the clinic and marketed by Abbvie, formerly Abbott Laboratories. CAT was also behind belimumab, the anti-BlyS antibody drug marketed as Benlysta and the first new approved drug for systemic lupus in more than 50 years. In 2018, the Nobel Prize organisation awarded one quarter of the Nobel Prize in Chemistry to a founding member of CAT, Sir Greg Winter FRS "for the phage display of peptides and antibodies".

Founded in 1989, CAT was acquired by AstraZeneca for £702m in 2006. AstraZeneca subsequently acquired MedImmune LLC, which it combined with CAT to form a global biologics R&D division called MedImmune. CAT was often described as the 'jewel in the crown' of the British biotechnology industry and during the latter years of its existence was the subject of frequent acquisition speculation.

== History ==
CAT was founded in 1989 by Dr. David Chiswell OBE and Sir Greg Winter, with major scientific contributions from Dr. John McCafferty and the Medical Research Council (UK) (MRC). Operations began at the MRC laboratories in Cambridge. In May 1990, operations moved to the Daly Research Laboratories at Babraham Institute, Cambridge.

In 1992, CAT moved to Beech House on the Melbourn Science Park to occupy units B1 and B2. In 1993 the company expanded into unit B3, into B4 into 1995, and in 1998 into units B5, B6, B8 and B9. CAT completed the occupation of Beech House by finally occupying B7 by the late 1990s.

CAT listed on the London Stock Exchange in 1997, raising £43 million, and went through a second round of funding in 2000, raising over £90 million.

In 1999, CAT expanded into a second location in Melbourn called Cambridge House. After leaving Melbourn, CAT sold this location on to housing developers in early 2006.

In 2000, after a succession of deals that focussed on harnessing the exploitation of the human genome, CAT's share price peaked at over £50 per share.

Also in 2000, CAT decided to move out of Melbourn to a science park called Granta Park, roughly 10 miles (16 km) away. Of the buildings on the park, the first to be occupied was the Franklin Building followed, in late 2002, by a move to a new corporate headquarters at the Milstein Building.

The Franklin Building, named after Rosalind Franklin, was formally opened in 2001 by David Sainsbury, Baron Sainsbury of Turville. The Milstein Building was named after César Milstein, and had a modular design with separate laboratory (46,000 sq ft) and administration blocks (21,000 sq ft). In the same year, CAT listed on the NASDAQ.

When AstraZeneca acquired CAT in June 2006, plans were announced to occupy a new building on Granta Park, GP15, offering a further 92,000 sq ft (8,500 m^{2}). Refurbishment of this building took approximately 18 months and the building was officially opened, in November 2008, with the name Aaron Klug Building.

=== Acquisitions ===
==== Aptein Inc. ====
On 15 July 1998, CAT completed the acquisition of Aptein Inc. This acquisition "...further strengthened its world leading position in antibody display technology...giving CAT controlling patents in the field of polysome display. Polysome display involves the use of polysomes, a type of molecule responsible for protein synthesis within the human body, to display functional antibody proteins in vitro.". Three years later David Glover, CAT's Chief Medical Officer at the time, summarised the acquisition as one which essentially acquired Aptein's patent estate

"Under the terms of the agreement CAT purchased the issued share capital and outstanding share options and warrants of Aptein for a total consideration of up to $11 million satisfied by the issue of up to 2.366 million CAT shares (an implied CAT share price of 278p.) $6 million of the consideration was satisfied by the issue of 1.290 million CAT shares on closing. The balance of the consideration of up to $5 million will be satisfied by the issue of up to 1.076 million CAT shares after Aptein's European patents have been sustained through opposition or appeal. In accordance with accounting standards the cost of acquiring this new technology has been capitalised and will be written off over the lives of the patents concerned.".

Aptein was founded by Glenn Kawasaki, who is currently, amongst other positions, CEO at Accium BioSciences.

According to an article published in Nature in 2002, that focused on the automation of proteomics,..."Normally, an mRNA molecule passes through the ribosome-like ticker-tape and is released, along with the newly synthesised protein molecule, when a sequence of three bases known as a 'stop codon' is reached. In Aptein's technology, stop codons are eliminated so that the completed antibody and its mRNA remain bound together on the ribosome. The system, which CAT is now optimising, is entirely cell-free and so is more amenable to automation. This should make it possible to construct libraries that are orders of magnitude larger than those created using phage display."

CAT published on their optimisation work with Ribosome Display, including:

- The discovery of tralokinumab, a therapeutic antibody against IL-13.
- An improved method for eukaryotic ribosome display
- A comparison of phage and ribosome display approaches for improving antibody affinity and stability showing the advantages of ribosome display
- The use of ribosome display to optimise pharmacology and "developability" of therapeutic proteins

CAT used extensive data sets from ribosome display to patent protect their anti-IL-13 monoclonal antibody, CAT-354, in a world-first of sequence-activity-relationship claims.

==== Drug Royalty Corporation Inc. ====
In 1994, CAT signed a royalty deal with Drug Royalty Corporation Inc. (DRC) such that DRC would receive future royalty revenue from CAT's products.

In January 2002, CAT made a share-based offer to buy DRC for £55 million so that it could buy out this royalty obligation. CAT valued DRC at C$3.00 a share, and this offer was initially recommended by the board of directors of DRC. On 8 March 2002 the investment company Inwest made a competing offer valuing DRC at C$3.05 per share. CAT's offer would see DRC shareholders receiving CAT shares whilst Inwest's offer would see the DRC shareholder receiving cash. DRC's board of directors changed their decision and recommended Inwest's offer. After a number of deadline extensions from CAT the offer from Inwest was accepted by the DRC shareholders. Inwest purchased DRC on 2 May 2002, and the company began operating as a private entity that continues operation today as DRI Capital.

As a result of this failure to purchase DRC, CAT's right to buy back royalty interest was triggered at a cost to CAT of C$14 million (£6.2 million) by way of 463,818 CAT shares.

==== Oxford Glycosciences ====
On 23 January 2003 CAT made a share-based offer for Oxford Glycosciences (OGS) and at an Extraordinary General Meeting shareholders voted to approve the merger. In March of this year CAT saw a decline in its share price. Discussions regarding the applicability of the royalty offset provisions for HUMIRA with Abbott Laboratories had started, and these had a negative impact on the CAT share price depressing the value of CAT's offer.

On 26 February 2003 the British-based biotechnology group Celltech subsequently made a hostile £101 million cash offer for OGS and began buying OGS shares. Some reported that this activity represented the UK biotechnology industry's first-ever bidding war. Despite this improved offer from Celltech, OGS continued to recommend the CAT offer.

Celltech continued to buy OGS shares and the OGS board pressed CAT to improve the terms of its offer as the Celltech shareholding reached 10.55%. OGS became alarmed that Celltech's share purchase would prompt CAT to walk away because, under takeover rules, it would not be able to forcibly purchase the 10.55 per cent stake Celltech owned. CAT failed to improve the terms of its bid forcing OGS to abandon the agreement.

Celltech continued buying shares and, as their stake reached 25%, so the board of OGS met to reluctantly recommend the Celltech offer. Celltech completed the purchase of OGS in April 2003. Some newspapers reported that the failure of the bid by CAT would means that CAT would have to cut some of its workforce. Celltech was itself purchased by the Belgian drugmaker UCB in mid-2004.

==== Genencor ====
On 1 November 2005 CAT announced it was acquiring two anti-CD22 immunotoxin products from Genencor, namely GCR-3888 and GCR-8015. Genencor is the biotechnology division of Danisco and the acquisition meant CAT would hire certain former Genencor key employees to be responsible for the development of the programmes.

GCR-3888 and GCR-8015 were discovered and initially developed by the National Cancer Institute, which is part of the U.S. National Institutes of Health. Genencor licensed the candidates for hematological malignancies and entered into a Cooperative Research and Development Agreement (CRADA) with the NIH, which will now be continued by CAT. Under the original licence agreement with the NIH, CAT gained the rights to a portfolio of intellectual property associated with the programs and would pay future royalties to the NIH.

CAT intended to file an Investigational New Drug (IND) application for GCR-8015 in various CD22 positive B-cell malignancies, including Non-Hodgkin lymphoma and chronic lymphocytic leukaemia, following a period of manufacturing development which is expected to be complete by the end of 2006 and to support the NCI's ongoing development of GCR-3888 in Hairy cell leukaemia (HCL) and paediatric acute lymphoblastic leukaemia (pALL).

CAT-8015 exhibited a greater affinity for CD22 than its predecessor, CAT-3888 and CAT's language such as "CAT will support the NCI's ongoing development of CAT-3888..." suggested at the time that their focus was on the second generation candidate.

On 16 May 2013, AstraZeneca announced that CAT-8015, now Moxetumumab, has started Phase III clinical trials.

=== Collaborations ===
CAT entered into many collaborations with technology and pharmaceutical companies, including:

- Searle, 1999 – CAT signed, what was at the time, their biggest deal with Searle, the pharmaceutical arm of Monsanto. In 2000, Pharmacia & Upjohn merged with Monsanto and Searle to create Pharmacia Corporation. In 2003, Pfizer acquired Pharmacia. It is unsure as to whether the deal with Searle generated any clinical candidates.
- Human Genome Sciences, 2000. GlaxoSmithKline purchased HGSI in 2012. The deal with Cambridge Antibody Technology generated, amongst others;
  - An anti-BLyS antibody – registered by HGSI as LymphoStat-B, also known as belimumab, and subsequently branded as Benlysta. On 16 November 2010 HGSI and GlaxoSmithKline announced the vote of the FDA advisory committee to recommend approval of belimumab for systemic lupus erythematosus. On 9 March 2011 the FDA voted 11 to 2 in favour of approving Benlysta "to treat patients with active, autoantibody-positive lupus who are receiving standard therapy, including corticosteroids, antimalarials, immunosuppressives, and nonsteroidal anti-inflammatory drugs".
  - An anthrax therapeutic antibody – registered by HGSI as ABthrax, also known as raxibacumab. At the 2 November 2012 meeting of the Anti-Infective Drugs Advisory Committee to the US Food and Drug Administration (FDA) members "voted 16 to 1 in support of the clinical benefit of raxibacumab for the treatment of inhalational anthrax, with one abstention. In addition, the committee voted 18 – 0 in favour of the risk-benefit profile of raxibacumab".
  - Two anti-TRAIL receptor antibodies – mapatumumab (HGS-ETR1) and lexatumumab (HGS-ETR2). Early work by CAT and HGS scientists showed that HGS-ETR1 induces cell death in certain tumour types. Following this data, HGS exercised an option to enter into an exclusive development partnership for the antibody.
- Genzyme, 2000. CAT held significant strength in the area of TGF beta with two products already – lerdelimumab (CAT-152) and metelimumab (CAT-192). The deal with Genzyme was "a broad strategic alliance to develop and commercialise human monoclonal antibodies directed against TGF-beta." All clinical indications, with the exception of ophthalmic uses, were covered by the agreement.
  - The deal resulted in fresolimumab (GC1008), a pan-neutralizing IgG4 human antibody directed against all three isoforms of TGF beta, which had the "potential for treating a variety of diseases". In particular Genzyme are currently using fresolimumab in trials involving immunogenic tumours.
  - The takeover of CAT by AstraZeneca initiated a change of control clause in the 2008 agreement that gives Genzyme the right to buy out rights to a jointly developed experimental lung drug.
  - In February 2011, Sanofi-Aventis purchased Genzyme for approximately US$20bn.
- Immunex Corp, 2000. CAT's proprietary antibody phage display library for the discovery, development and potential commercialisation of human monoclonal antibodies was licensed to Immunex, in return for a licence fee. This deal was expanded in May 2001 where CAT shared more of the risk of drug development – a so-called "profit-sharing" deal. In 2002 Immunex was acquired by Amgen and in December 2003 CAT entered into a new, restructured agreement with Amgen, reportedly focussing in skin disease. It was also reported that, under the terms of the agreement, Amgen had taken responsibility for the further development and marketing of the therapeutic antibody candidates isolated by CAT against two targets on which the parties agreed to collaborate and would bear all the associated costs. In return, CAT received from Amgen an initial fee and potential milestone payments and royalties on future sales. As of February 2004, one candidate had been delivered by CAT to Amgen. A second candidate was the subject of a continuing research program funded by Amgen and conducted by CAT and was to be delivered to Amgen in due course.
  - Amgen acquired the transgenic mouse company Abgenix meaning that they had access to two different methods of human monoclonal antibody production. As of July 2009, it is not known from which technology any of their monoclonal antibody products in clinical trials have been derived.
- AMRAD, 2001. AMRAD subsequently changed its name to Zenyth Therapeutics and, in mid-2006, Zenyth was acquired by CSL Limited. CAT and AMRAD had gone 50:50 with the original deal over the development of an anti-GMCSF-R antibody, which became CAM-3001. After all this corporate manoeuvring, "CSL decided to license its 50% share in the project to MedImmune...MedImmune commenced Phase I clinical trials in December 2007".

== Products and pipeline ==
CAT had a number of significant products in the pipeline. These included:

- Adalimumab (D2E7) – a human monoclonal antibody to tumor necrosis factor-alpha (TNF alpha). This drug went on to be developed and marketed by Abbott Laboratories as Humira®. The royalties payable on Adalimumab sales were subject to a dispute between the two companies. In 2013, Abbott split it business in half, whereby AbbVie became responsible for its research-based pharmaceutical business, and thus Humira. Humira went on to dominate the best-selling drugs lists. In 2016, the best selling drugs list researched by Genetic Engineering & Biotechnology News, published in March 2017, details that Humira occupied the number 1 position for 2015 ($14.012 billion of sales) and 2016 ($16.078 billion). Whilst for 2017, Abbvie reports that Humira achieved $18.427billion of sales in 2017
- Briakinumab (ABT-874) – a human monoclonal antibody to IL-12 and IL-23. This went on to be developed by Abbott Laboratories for treatment of psoriasis and Crohn's disease. On 11 October 2010, Abbott presented positive Phase III data.
- Metelimumab (CAT-192) and fresolimumab (GC1008) are human monoclonal antibodies to transforming growth factor beta 1 (TGF-β1). Initial trials targeted the skin condition scleroderma but, after some unsuccessful clinical trial results, the product was dropped in favour of fresolimumab, which was initially developed by Genzyme. In February 2011, Sanofi-Aventis purchased Genzyme for approximately US$20 billion and, as of March 2013, Sanofi continue to list fresolimumab in their research and development portfolio.
- Lerdelimumab is a human monoclonal antibody to TGF beta 2, initially developed to combat fibrotic scarring that results from glaucoma drainage surgery. The drug was branded Trabio, and development was stopped in late 2005 after unsuccessful trial results.
- Bertilimumab (CAT-213) is a human monoclonal antibody to eotaxin 1. In January 2007, CAT licensed the drug for treatment of allergy disorders to iCo Therapeutics Inc., who renamed it from CAT-213 to iCo-008.
- Mavrilimumab (CAM-3001) – a human monoclonal igG4 antibody to the alpha chain of granulocyte macrophage colony-stimulating factor (GM-CSF Receptor). In 2007, some elements of the local press suggested this product could be the next HUMIRA. CAM-3001 is currently being developed by MedImmune in the treatment of rheumatoid arthritis, and mentioned in the rheumatology section of AstraZeneca's pipeline in their 2008 Annual Report. The first clinical trial was initiated by MedImmune in late 2007. In 2017, Kiniksa licensed Mavrilimumab from MedImmune and, in April 2021, Kiniksa outlined the next steps for development of Mavrilimumab – including in COVID-19–related acute respiratory distress syndrome (ARDS), giant cell arteritis (GCA), and rheumatoid arthritis (RA).
- Tralokinumab (CAT-354, Adtralza®) – a human monoclonal antibody (IgG4) that potently and specifically neutralises interleukin 13, a T-lymphocyte-derived cytokine that plays a key role in the development and maintenance of the human asthmatic phenotype. CAT-354 was CAT's first antibody to be discovered using ribosome display, and was further developed by developed by MedImmune. Tralokinumab was licensed by AstraZeneca to LEO Pharma for skin diseases in July 2016. On 15 June 2017, Leo Pharma announced that they were starting phase 3 clinical trials with tralokinumab in atopic dermatitis. In April 2021, Leo Pharma announced that it had received positive Committee for Medicinal Products for Human Use (CHMP) of the European Medicines Agency (EMA) opinion of Adtralza® (tralokinumab) for the treatment of adults with moderate-to-severe atopic dermatitis. On 22 June 2021, LEO Pharma announced that the European Commission had approved "Adtralza® (tralokinumab) as the first and only treatment specifically targeting IL-13 for adults with moderate-to-severe atopic dermatitis".
- Moxetumomab pasudotox (CAT-3888) – CAT-3888 (formerly GCR-3888 and BL22) and CAT-8015 (formerly GCR-8015 and HA22) are both anti-CD22 immunotoxins comprising a modified Pseudomonas exotoxin and an anti-CD22 antibody fragment. CAT acquired these two oncology product candidates in November 2005 from Genencor, a subsidiary of Danisco. CAT-8015 is being developed by MedImmune. In Sept 2018 the US FDA approved it (as Lumoxiti) for some cases of relapsed or refractory hairy cell leukemia (HCL).
- CAT-5001 (formerly SS1P) – a Pseudomonas exotoxin immunotoxin that targets mesothelin, which is a cell surface glycoprotein present on normal mesothelial cells that is over-expressed in numerous cancers including pleural and peritoneal mesothelioma, ovarian cancer and pancreatic cancer. CAT-5001 was acquired from Enzon Pharmaceuticals in May 2006.

CAT developed their display technologies further into several patented antibody discovery/functional genomics tools which were named Proximol and ProAb. ProAb was announced in December 1997 and involved high throughput screening of antibody libraries against diseased and non-diseased tissue, whilst Proximol used a free radical enzymatic reaction to label molecules in proximity to a given protein.

In September 1999, it was announced that CAT's Library product and ProAb would each receive Millennium Products status. Of the 4,000 products submitted to the Design Council for these awards, 1,012 were chosen and, to attain Millennium Product status, products had to: open up new opportunities, challenge existing conventions, be environmentally responsible, demonstrate the application of new or existing technology, solve a key problem and show clear user benefits.

== Patents ==
CAT pioneered the application of Phage Display and Ribosome Display technology for the design and development of human monoclonal antibody therapeutics and which was reflected in the breadth of the company's patent portfolio. The Cambridge patent portfolio includes about 40 families of patents, covering both technologies and products.

Three main families of major patents cover Cambridge antibody library and Phage Display technology:

'Winter II' and 'Winter/Huse/Lerner' patents cover Medimmune's processes for generating the collections of human antibody genes that comprise MedImmune Cambridge libraries. MedImmune has patents issued in Europe, South Korea, Japan, Australia and the US and a patent application is pending in Canada. These patents are co-owned by the MRC, The Scripps Research Institute and Stratagene and MedImmune currently has exclusive commercial exploitation rights, subject to certain rights held by the Medical Research Council (MRC), Scripps and Stratagene and their pre-existing licensees.

'McCafferty' covers the process by which human antibodies are displayed on phage (Phage Display) and methods of selecting antibodies to desired targets from libraries. MedImmune has patents issued in Europe, Australia, South Korea and Japan and a patent application is pending in Canada. These patents are co-owned by MedImmune and the MRC.

'Griffiths' covers the use of Phage Display technology to isolate human anti-self' antibodies that specifically bind to molecules found in the human body. CAT has patents issued in Australia, Europe and the US and patent applications are pending in Canada and Japan. This patent is co-owned by MedImmune Cambridge and the MRC.

In 2011 "The High Court of England and Wales has ruled that two patents (EP 0774511 and EP 2055777) owned by MedImmune that describe methods of phage display are invalid because of obviousness."

=== List of Patents ===
	Winter II	Winter/Huse/Lerner		McCafferty	Griffiths	Kawasaki
PCT Publication Number	WO90/05144	WO90/14424	WO90/14430	WO92/01047	WO93/11236	WO91/05058
US	US6,248,516, US6,545,142	US6,291,158, US6,291,159	US6,291,160, US6,291,161, US6,680,192	US5,969,108, US6,172,197, US6,806,079	US5,885,793, US6,521,404, US6,544,731, US6,555,313, US6,593,081, US6,582,915	US5,643,768, US5,658,754
Europe	EP0368684	EP0472638	EP0425661, EP1026239 (pending as of July 2009)	EP0589877, EP0774511, EP0844306 (pending as of July 2009)	EP0616640, EP1024191 (pending as of July 2009)	EP0494955
Australia	AU0634186	AU651065	AU643948	AU0664155	AU0665221	AU038762
Japan	JP02919890	JP3321159	2-508759	JP03176917	5-509967 (pending as of July 2009)	JP03127158, 2000-240298 (pending as of July 2009)
Canada	2002868 (pending as of July 2009)	CA2016841	2016842	2086936 (pending as of July 2009)	2124460 (pending as of July 2009)	CA2067194
South Korea	KR0184860	–	–	KR0222326	–	KR0185192, KR0204359, KR0204360
Denmark	DK175392	–	–	–	–	–

=== Patent Dispute with MorphoSys ===
The German biotechnology company MorphoSys generates human antibodies using its phage display-based 'HuCal' (Human Combinatorial Antibody Library) technology. In the late 1990s both companies found themselves jockeying for strong IP position in the area of therapeutic human antibody generation by way of a specific dispute (details on MorphoSys page).

The long, and protracted, dispute resulted which was eventually settled in late 2002 when some argued the settlement was enforced by an industry cash crunch. The 'delighted' CEO at the time, Peter Chambré, reflected that the deal put an end to the distraction to both parties caused by the litigation.

== Publications ==
Scientists at CAT pioneered the use of phage display such that variable antibody domains could be expressed on filamentous phage antibodies, as reported in a key Nature publication, "Phage antibodies: filamentous phage displaying antibody variable domains".

Other key CAT publications included:

- Marks, JD; Hoogenboom, HR; Bonnert, TP; Mccafferty, J; Griffiths, AD; Winter, G (1991). "By-passing immunization. Human antibodies from V-gene libraries displayed on phage". Journal of Molecular Biology. 222 (3): 581–97. doi:10.1016/0022-2836(91)90498-U. PMID 1748994.
- Vaughan, TJ; Williams, AJ; Pritchard, K; Osbourn, JK; Pope, AR; Earnshaw, JC; Mccafferty, J; Hodits, RA; et al. (1996). "Human antibodies with sub-nanomolar affinities isolated from a large non-immunized phage display library". Nature Biotechnology. 14 (3): 309–14. doi:10.1038/nbt0396-309. PMID 9630891. S2CID 23088502.
- Carmen, S; Jermutus, L (2002). "Concepts in antibody phage display". Briefings in Functional Genomics & Proteomics. 1 (2): 189–203. doi:10.1093/bfgp/1.2.189. PMID 15239904.
- Thom, G; Cockroft, AC; Buchanan, AG; Candotti, CJ; Cohe, ES; Lowne, D; Monk, P; Shorrock-Hart, CP; Jermutus, L; Minter, RR (2006). "Probing a protein-protein interaction by directed evolution". Proc Natl Acad Sci USA. 103 (20): 7619–24. Bibcode:2006PNAS..103.7619T. doi:10.1073/pnas.0602341103. PMC 1458619. PMID 16684878.
- Edwards, BM; Barash, SC; Main, SH; Choi, GH; Minter, R; Ullrich, S; Williams, E; Du Fou, L; et al. (2003). "The remarkable flexibility of the human antibody repertoire; isolation of over one thousand different antibodies to a single protein, BLyS". Journal of Molecular Biology. 334 (1): 103–18. doi:10.1016/j.jmb.2003.09.054. PMID 14596803.
- Baker, KP; Edwards, BM; Main, SH; Choi, GH; Wager, RE; Halpern, WG; Lappin, PB; Riccobene, T; et al. (2003). "Generation and characterization of LymphoStat-B, a human monoclonal antibody that antagonizes the bioactivities of B lymphocyte stimulator". Arthritis and Rheumatism. 48 (11): 3253–65. doi:10.1002/art.11299. PMID 14613291.

== Management and notable people ==
CAT was founded by David Chiswell MBE and Sir Greg Winter, with major scientific contributions from John McCafferty.

Sir Greg Winter FRS is credited with invented techniques to both humanise (1986) and, later, to fully humanise using phage display, antibodies for therapeutic uses. Previously, antibodies had been derived from mice, which made them difficult to use in human therapeutics because the human immune system had anti-mouse reactions to them. For these developments Winter was awarded the 2018 Nobel Prize in Chemistry along with George Smith and Frances Arnold.

Dave Chiswell OBE was responsible for operational management of CAT from 1990 to 2002, including time as chief executive officer from 1996 to 2002. Chiswell announced he was standing down from CAT on 26 November 2001. During his time at CAT, Chiswell had established himself as a significant character in the biotechnology business. In 2003, Chiswell became chairman of the BioIndustry Association, and in June 2006 was awarded an OBE for services to the UK Bioscience Industry in the UK and Overseas.

CAT was governed by a board and, latterly, a Scientific Advisory Board. Members included:

- César Milstein CH FRS, a Nobel Prize-winning biochemist in the field of antibody research. Milstein shared the Nobel Prize in Physiology and Medicine in 1984 with Niels Jerne and Georges Köhler.
- Sir Aaron Klug OM FRS FMedSci HonFRMS, a Nobel Prize-winning laureate, was a British chemist and biophysicist, and winner of the 1982 Nobel Prize in Chemistry for his development of crystallographic electron microscopy. He sat on both the board and the scientific advisory board.
- Professor Peter Garland – appointed as a non-executive director in 1990, then became non-executive chairman of the board in 1995. Garland has been the Chief Executive of Institute of Cancer Research, 1989–99 and was a fellow of University College London.
- Dr Paul Nicholson – replaced Peter Garland as chairman in 2003. Nicholson was chairman when AstraZeneca bought CAT.

Peter Chambré replaced Dave Chiswell as CEO in early 2002. Chambré had been the CEO of Bespak PLC since May 1994 and, in July 2000, became the chief operating officer of the genomics company Celera. A few years after CAT, Chambré went on to hold a number of roles including director positions at BTG and Spectris, followed by an Industrialist in Residence position at 3i. Chambré went on to executive positions at Cancer Research UK, and more recently, Chambré became Chairman of the Board of Directors at Immatics biotechnologies NV, and Member of the Board of Trustees at Our Future Health.

John McCafferty developed much of the phage display technology used by CAT. McCafferty left CAT to start a group at the Wellcome Trust Sanger Institute where, as part of the ATLAS project, his group demonstrated the potential for large-scale high-throughput generation and validation of monoclonal antibodies. This work built on CAT's ProAb technology. McCafferty founded a new therapeutic antibody discovery biotechnology company, IONTAS Ltd. In 2018, McCafferty's 1990 phage research paper was cited by the Nobel committee when awarding the chemistry prize to Sir Gregory Winter, George Smith and Frances Arnold.

Kevin Johnson joined CAT in 1990, contributed to the discovery of D2E7, played a key role in CAT's initial public offering (IPO) and, by July 1997, was appointed to the Board as Research Director. In 2000, Johnson became Chief Technology Officer responsible for exploitation and development of CAT's technology platforms. In November 2002, CAT announced its intention to seek independent financing for its development of the application of antibodies on microarrays for personalised medicine, as this fell outside CAT's focus on therapeutic antibodies and Johnson positively spearheaded this push. In the event it was not possible to procure finance for this activity and, as a result, microarray activity at CAT was terminated. Johnson is currently a partner at medicxi, a venture capital firm focused on life sciences investments based on the asset-centric approach to investing. He was formerly with Index Ventures, having joined the venture capital firm in 2010.

Jane Osbourn OBE joined CAT as a senior scientist in 1993. Osbourn was a co-author of several, high-impact publications to come out of CAT. When merged with MedImmune, after the acquisition by AstraZeneca, Osbourn became the site leader of MedImmune Cambridge. Osbourn went on to chair the UK's BioIndustry Association in 2015 and, in 2019, was awarded the Order of the British Empire medal for services to "Human Monoclonal Antibody Drug Research and Development and Biotechnology".

== Awards ==
CAT's most significant award was the Prix Galien, awarded for outstanding achievement in product and technology development, in recognition of its creativity in the development of novel human monoclonal antibody therapeutics especially in relation to its product CAT-152, which was used to treat fibrotic scarring in certain ophthalmology conditions.

== See also ==
- Pharmaceutical industry in the United Kingdom
