= Kevin Johnson (venture capitalist) =

Welsh venture capitalist (born 1960)

Kevin Johnson (born 30 August 1960 in Holyhead, Wales) is a partner at medicxi, a venture capital firm focused on life sciences investments based on the asset-centric approach to investing. He was formerly with Index Ventures, having joined the venture capital firm in 2010.

== Education and career ==
Johnson graduated in Molecular Biology from Edinburgh University and has a PhD in Pathology from Cambridge University.

From 1990 onwards, Johnson was one of the team at Cambridge Antibody Technology (CAT), heading up research and in 1997 he was appointed to the board, where he held the posts of Research Director and Chief Technology Officer. Kevin led both the development of CAT's platform technologies, and also their application to the discovery of a number of human antibodies currently in clinical development, including the first such drug, Humira to reach the market. He was also part of the management team that floated CAT on the London Stock Exchange (main market).

Johnson was CEO of PanGenetics before it was acquired by Abbott Laboratories for $170 million in 2009.

From 2004 to 2016, Johnson worked with Index Ventures' Life Sciences team, first as a venture advisor and then as a partner, and in 2016 co-founded medicxi with three other Index partners.

== Index Ventures Portfolio Company Involvement ==
- Molecular Partners
- PanGenetics (acquired by Abbott Pharmaceuticals)
- Versartis
- Diartis Pharmaceuticals

== Feature Articles ==
Index Appoints Johnson Partner

== Related Awards ==
In 2010, Pangenetics was shortlisted for the Newsflow category at the Genesis 2010 Awards and for Management Team of the Year at the Scrip Awards.
