= John McCafferty =

British scientist

John McCafferty is a British scientist, one of the founders of Cambridge Antibody Technology alongside Sir Gregory Winter and David Chiswell. He is well known as one of the inventors of scFv antibody fragment phage display, a technology that revolutionised the monoclonal antibody drug discovery. McCafferty and his team developed this process following failures previously generating antibodies by immunizing mice. Later improvements of antibody phage display technology enables the display of millions of different antibody fragments on the surface of filamentous phage (better known as antibody phage library) and subsequent selection of highly specific recombinant antibodies to any given target. This technology is widely exploited in pharmaceutical industry for the discovery and development of therapeutic monoclonal antibodies to treat mainly cancer, inflammatory and infectious diseases. One of the most successful was HUMIRA (adalimumab), discovered by Cambridge Antibody Technology as D2E7 and developed and marketed by Abbott Laboratories. HUMIRA, an antibody to TNF alpha, was the world's first phage display derived fully human antibody, which achieved annual sales exceeding $1bn therefore achieving blockbuster status. Humira went on to dominate the best-selling drugs lists - in 2016: The best selling drugs list researched by Genetic Engineering & Biotechnology News, published in March 2017, details that Humira occupied the number 1 position for 2015 ($14.012 billion) and 2016 ($16.078 billion). Whilst for 2017, Abbvie reports that Humira achieved $18.427billion of sales in 2017

In 2002, after 12 years in Cambridge Antibody Technology (now MedImmune, a fully owned subsidiary of pharmaceutical giant AstraZeneca), McCafferty set up a group at the Sanger Institute developing and utilising methods for protein generation and recombinant antibody isolation in high throughput for proteomic applications. McCafferty has been involved in developing large human antibody repertoires both at CAT and at the Sanger Institute from which antibodies of high affinity and specificity to any antigen can be derived. He ran a laboratory at the Biochemistry Dept at University of Cambridge capitalising on the above technologies with a focus on the study of protein:protein interactions driving direct cell:cell communication and has recently founded a new therapeutic antibody discovery biotechnology company, IONTAS Ltd.

In 2018, McCafferty's 1990 phage research paper was cited by the Nobel committee when awarding the chemistry prize to Sir Gregory Winter and George Smith. In 2026, he was elected a Fellow of the Academy of Medical Sciences and a Fellow of the Royal Society.
