= C6428H9912N1694O1987S46 =

The molecular formula C_{6428}H_{9912}N_{1694}O_{1987}S_{46} (molar mass: 144190.3 g/mol) may refer to:

- Adalimumab
- Infliximab
