= Michael Kinch =

American academic and writer

- Born: Michael Scott Kinch; 10 December 1966 (age 59); Hamilton, Ohio, U.S.
- Education: Ohio State University; Duke University
- Scientific career
- Fields: Microbiology, Immunology
- Workplaces: Stony Brook University; Long Island University Washington University in St. Louis; Yale University; Purdue University

Michael Scott Kinch (born 1966) is an American academic and Chief Innovation Officer at Stony Brook University. Prior to this, he was Associate Vice Chancellor at Washington University in St. Louis where he helped lead innovation and entrepreneurship activities.

Kinch is known for his research and writing about the fields of cancer biology and infectious disease and the history of biomedicine and pharmaceutical industry innovation

== Career ==
Kinch began an independent research career focused upon cancer biology at Purdue University in West Lafayette, Indiana in 1996. Though obtaining tenure in 2000, Kinch left academia in late 2001 to start and lead a cancer biology department at MedImmune, Inc. in Gaithersburg, MD. In 2006, Kinch led research and development at Functional Genetics, Inc., a biotechnology focused upon cancer and infectious diseases, also located in Gaithersburg. In late 2010, Kinch returned to academia, joining Yale University founding and leading the Yale Center for Drug Discovery in West Haven, CT. At that time, he began aggregating information about the sources of innovation and entrepreneurship responsible for the introduction of new medicines, a subject that would later serve as the subject for a series of trade books. In 2016, Kinch moved to Washington University School of Medicine, where he founded two centers, the Center for Drug Discovery and the Center for Research Innovation in Biotechnology, and to help lead innovation and entrepreneurship activities.

In 2024, Michael Scott Kinch was appointed Chief Innovation Officer at Stony Brook University.

== Writings ==
Kinch has authored more than two hundred peer-reviewed scientific papers or patents and published three trade books.

His first book, A Prescription for Change, is a popular science book, debuting in 2016, which details the history of drug development throughout history, culminating in the proposition that the rising inefficiency in drug discovery threatens our ability to develop new medicines.

A second book, Between Hope and Fear (2018), chronicles the development of vaccines, ranging from the discovery of the first vaccine, which is commonly misattributed to Edward Jenner to recent times. This book also details the rise of anti-vaccine movement, which has commonly accompanied high-profile vaccines. Kirkus Reviews called it "a riveting chronicle of one of the greatest accomplishments in the history of medical science." A review in The Wall Street Journal advised that the book "ought to be read by parents and policy makers alike, and its message heeded by all."

His third book, The End of the Beginning, provides a history of immune-based treatments for cancer. This book reveals that the foundations for modern therapies were established more than a century ago and chronicles the political struggles and scientific discoveries that led to a new generation of life-saving therapies.

A fourth book, The Price of Health: The Modern Pharmaceutical Industry and the Betrayal of a History of Care details the causes of increasing drug prices. The book reveals these outcomes result from a combination of an increasing complexity in both the science and business of drug development and reimbursement.

== Books ==
Kinch has written the following books:

Title	Publication Date	Genre	Notes
A Prescription for Change: The Looming Crisis in Drug Development	November, 2016	Science	
Between Hope and Fear: A History of Vaccines and Human Immunity	July, 2018	Science	
The End of the Beginning: Cancer, Immunity and the Future of a Cure	April, 2019	Science	
The Price of Health: The Modern Pharmaceutical Industry and the Betrayal of a History of Care	April, 2021	Healthcare	Co-authored with Lori A. Weiman
