= TGF beta activation =

Transforming growth factor beta (TGF-β) is a potent cell regulatory polypeptide homodimer of 25kD. It is a multifunctional signaling molecule with more than 40 related family members. TGF-β plays a role in a wide array of cellular processes including early embryonic development, cell growth, differentiation, motility, and apoptosis.

== TGF-β activation ==
Although TGF-β is important in regulating crucial cellular activities, only few TGF beta signaling pathway activations are currently known, and yet, the full mechanism behind the suggested activation pathways is not well understood. Some of the known activating pathways are cell or tissue specific, while some are seen in multiple cell types and tissues. Proteases, integrins, pH, and reactive oxygen species are just few of the currently known factors that can activate TGF-β. It is well known that perturbations of these activating factors can lead to unregulated TGF-β signaling levels that may cause several complications including inflammation, autoimmune disorders, fibrosis, cancer and cataracts. In most cases an activated TGF-β ligand will initiate the TGF-β signaling cascade as long as TGF-β receptors I and II are within reach, this is due to high affinity between TGF-β and its receptors, suggesting why the TGF-β signaling recruits a latency system to mediates its signaling.

== TGF-β latency (latent TGF-β complex) ==
All three TGFβ1, TGFβ2 and TGFβ3. are synthesized as precursor molecules containing a propeptide region in addition to the TGF-β homodimer. After it is synthesized, the TGF-β homodimer interact with a Latency Associated Peptide (LAP)[a protein derived from the N-terminal region of the TGF beta gene product] forming a complex called Small Latent Complex (SLC). This complex remains in the cell until it is bound by another protein called Latent TGF-β-Binding Protein (LTBP), forming a larger complex called Large Latent Complex (LLC). It is LLC that gets secreted to the ECM.

In most cases, before the LLC is secreted, the TGF-β precursor is cleaved from the propeptide but remains attached to it by noncovalent bonds. After its secretion, it remains in the extracellular matrix as an inactivated complex containing both the LTBP and the LAP which need to be further processed in order to release active TGF-β. The attachment of TGF-β to the LTBP is by disulfide bond which allows it to remain inactive by preventing it from binding to its receptors. Because different cellular mechanisms require distinct levels of TGF-β signaling, the inactive complex of this cytokine gives opportunity for a proper mediation of TGF-β signaling.

There are four different LTBP isoforms known, LTBP-1, LTBP-2, LTBP-3 and LTBP-4. Mutation or alteration of LAP or LTBP can result in improper TGF-β signaling. Mice lacking LTBP-3 or LTBP-4 demonstrate phenotypes consistent with phenotypes seen in mice with altered TGF-β signaling. Furthermore, specific LTBP isoforms have a propensity to associate with specific TGF-β isoforms. For example, LTBP-4 is reported to bind only to TGF-β1, thus, mutation in LTBP-4 can lead to TGF-β associated complications which are specific to tissues that predominantly involves TGF-β1. Moreover, the structural differences within the LTBP’s provide different latent TGF-β complexes which are selective but to specific stimuli generated by specific activators.

== Integrin-independent TGF-β activation ==
- Activation by protease and metalloprotease

Plasmin and a number of Matrix metalloproteinases (MMP) play a key role in promoting tumor invasion and tissue remodeling by inducing proteolysis of several ECM components. The TGF-β activation process involves the release of the LLC from the matrix, followed by further proteolysis of the LAP to release TGF-β to its receptors. MMP-9 and MMP-2 are known to cleave latent TGF-β. The LAP complex contains a protease-sensitive hinge region which can be the potential target for this liberation of TGF-β. Despite the fact that MMPs have been proven to play a key role in activating TGF-β, mice with mutations in MMP-9 and MMP-2 genes can still activate TGF-β and do not show any TGF-β deficiency phenotypes, this may reflect redundancy among the activating enzymes suggesting that other unknown proteases might be involved.

- Activation by pH

Acidic conditions can denature the LAP. Treatment of the medium with extremes of pH (1.5 or 12) resulted in significant activation of TGF beta as shown by radio-receptor assays, while mild acid treatment (pH 4.5) yielded only 20-30% of the competition achieved by pH 1.5.

- Activation reactive oxygen species (ROS)

The LAP structure is important to maintain its function. Structure modification of the LAP can lead to disturbing the interaction between LAP and TGF-β and thus activating it. Factors that may cause such modification may include hydroxyl radicals from reactive oxygen species (ROS). TGF-β was rapidly activated after in vivo radiation exposure ROS.

- Activation by thrombospondin-1

Thrombospondin-1 (TSP-1) is a matricellular glycoprotein found in plasma of healthy patients with levels in the range of 50–250 ng/ml. TSP-1 levels are known to increase in response to injury and during development. TSP-1 activates latent TGF-beta by forming direct interactions with the latent TGF-β complex and induces a conformational rearrangement preventing it from binding to the matured TGF-β.

== Activation by Alpha(V) containing integrins ==
The general theme of integrins to participate in latent TGF-β1 activation, arose from studies that examined mutations/knockouts of β6 integrin, αV integrin, β8 integrin and in LAP. These mutations produced phenotypes that were similar to phenotypes seen in TGF-β1 knockout mice. Currently there are two proposed models of how αV containing integrins can activate latent TGF-β1; the first proposed model is by inducing conformational change to the latent TGF-β1 complex and hence releasing the active TGF-β1 and the second model is by a protease-dependent mechanism.

- Conformation change mechanism pathway (without proteolysis)

αVβ6 integrin was the first integrin to be identified as TGF-β1 activator. LAPs contain an RGD motif which is recognized by vast majority of αV containing integrins, and αVβ6 integrin can activate TGF-β1 by binding to the RGD motif present in LAP-β1 and LAP-β 3. Upon binding, it induces adhesion-mediated cell forces that are translated into biochemical signals which can lead to liberation/activation of TGFb from its latent complex. This pathway has been demonstrated for activation of TGF-β in epithelial cells and does not associate MMPs.

- Integrin protease-dependent activation mechanism

Because MMP-2 and MMP-9 can activate TGF-β through proteolytic degradation of the latent TGF beta complex, αV containing integrins activates TGF-β1 by creating a close connection between the latent TGF-β complex and MMPs. Integrins αVβ6 and αVβ3 are suggested to simultaneously bind the latent TGF-β1 complex and proteinases, simultaneous inducing conformation changes of the LAP and sequestering proteases to close proximity. Regardless of involving MMPs, this mechanism still necessitate the association of intergrins and that makes it a non protolylic pathway.
