= Briakinumab =

Monoclonal antibody

Monoclonal antibody
- Type: Whole antibody
- Source: Human
- Target: IL-12 and IL-23

Clinical data
- ATC code: L04AC09 (WHO)

Legal status
- Legal status: investigational

Pharmacokinetic data
- Bioavailability: N/A

Identifiers
- CAS Number: 339308-60-0
- ChemSpider: none
- UNII: 978I8M0P8X

Chemical and physical data
- Formula: C_{6376}H_{9874}N_{1722}O_{1992}S_{44}
- Molar mass: 143935.83 g·mol^{−1}

Briakinumab (ABT-874) is a human monoclonal antibody being developed by Abbott Laboratories for the treatment of rheumatoid arthritis, inflammatory bowel disease, and multiple sclerosis. As of 2011 drug development for psoriasis has been discontinued in the U.S. and Europe.

Like ustekinumab, the antibody targets the interleukins 12 and 23.

== Discovery ==
The candidate drug was discovered by Cambridge Antibody Technology in collaboration with Abbott.

== Trials ==
As of November 2009, Phase III clinical trials for plaque psoriasis and a Phase II trial for multiple sclerosis have been completed, and a Phase II trial for Crohn's disease is underway.

Briakinumab was compared to etanercept and placebo in several double-blind trials. The Psoriasis Area Severity Index (PASI) was reduced significantly better than under the comparator treatments. 81–82% of patients under briakinumab, 40–56% under etanercept, and 7% under placebo reached PASI reduction of at least 75%. No head-to-head studies against ustekinumab, the other IL-12/23 inhibitor, are available.

On January 15, 2011, Abbott announced the withdrawal of its application to the US FDA and European regulators for briakinumab. Following feedback from regulatory authorities indicating the need for further analysis, including the potential for additional studies, Abbott withdrew its applications and was evaluating next steps including possible resubmission at a later date. This compound has never been resubmitted for approval.

== Royalties ==
This is the second candidate from a deal with Cambridge Antibody Technology that Abbott have taken to late-stage clinical trials. As a result of the protracted royalty dispute over Humira Abbott agreed to pay CAT a reduced royalty of 4.75% on any future sales of ABT-874, from which CAT will pay a portion to the MRC and other licensors (according to CAT's 1997 agreement with the MRC).
