= Mavrilimumab =

Monoclonal antibody

Monoclonal antibody
- Type: Whole antibody
- Source: Human
- Target: GM-CSF receptor alpha chain

Clinical data
- ATC code: none

Identifiers
- CAS Number: 1085337-57-0
- IUPHAR/BPS: 7785
- ChemSpider: none
- UNII: 1158JD1P9A

Chemical and physical data
- Formula: C_{6706}H_{10438}N_{1762}O_{2104}S_{54}
- Molar mass: 151140.74 g·mol^{−1}

Mavrilimumab is a human monoclonal antibody that inhibits human granulocyte macrophage colony-stimulating factor receptor (GM-CSF-R).

Mavrilimumab was discovered as CAM-3001 by Cambridge Antibody Technology and is being developed by MedImmune, Inc. as an investigational drug for the treatment of rheumatoid arthritis

Mavrilimumab has been studied in a phase 1 dose-ranging trial and a phase 2a clinical trial, both sponsored by Medimmune. The phase 2a trial, which studied mavrilimumab doses of up to 100 mg, reported that 55.7% of subjects met the primary endpoint of a ≥1.2 decrease from baseline in disease activity scores at week 12 (vs. only 34.7% of placebo subjects).

In 2013, two further clinical studies were reported to be underway in rheumatoid arthritis patients to investigate these effects further.

In early 2017 the phase IIb study was reported to be showing promising results.

In 2017, Kiniksa licensed Mavrilimumab from MedImmune.

It was studied in 2020 to see if it could improve the prognosis for patients with COVID-19 pneumonia and systemic hyperinflammation. One small study indicated some beneficial effects of treatment with mavrilimumab compared with those who were not.

In April 2021, Kiniksa outlined the next steps for development of Mavrilimumab - including in COVID-19–related acute respiratory distress syndrome (ARDS), giant cell arteritis (GCA), and rheumatoid arthritis (RA). “Recent favorable interactions with the FDA, based upon the clinical data generated with mavrilimumab in COVID-19-related ARDS, giant cell arteritis, and rheumatoid arthritis, underscore the broad utility of mavrilimumab and define a regulatory pathway for Phase 3 clinical development for each indication,” said Sanj K. Patel, Chief Executive Officer and Chairman of the Board of Kiniksa. “We believe the ongoing Phase 3 study of mavrilimumab in COVID-19-related ARDS represents the fastest path to potential registration for the asset, and there remains a significant unmet need in these patients. Enrollment in our Phase 3 clinical trial is ongoing, and we expect data in the first quarter of 2022.”.
