= Metelimumab =

Chemical compound

Monoclonal antibody
- Type: Whole antibody
- Source: Human
- Target: TGF beta 1

Clinical data
- ATC code: none

Legal status
- Legal status: Investigational

Identifiers
- CAS Number: 272780-74-2
- ChemSpider: none
- UNII: 4AR6718OL0

Metelimumab (CAT-192) is a human IgG4 monoclonal antibody that neutralizes TGF beta 1 which had been chosen for further development for the treatment of diffuse cutaneous systemic sclerosis, also known as scleroderma. It was dropped from further development in favour of fresolimumab, which was being developed by Genzyme as of 2006.

== History ==
Metelimumab was isolated by Cambridge Antibody Technology (CAT) using its phage display technology. In 2000, CAT signed a collaborative deal with Genzyme to further develop TGF beta antibodies.

In 2004, CAT and Genzyme revealed that Phase I/II trials of metelimumab for scleroderma showed this antibody to be safe and well tolerated across all dose levels, although no conclusions regarding efficacy of the compound could be made.

Initial trials targeted the skin condition scleroderma but, after some unsuccessful clinical trial results, the product was dropped in favour of fresolimumab, which was being developed by Genzyme as of 2006.
