= David Chiswell =

British business executive and scientist

David Chiswell OBE (1954 - 2024) was a British business executive and scientist who co-founded Cambridge Antibody Technology, a biosciences company in operation from 1990 to 2007. The company was an early innovator that pioneered the development of antibody drugs, including adalimumab, used in the treatment of rheumatoid arthritis among other things. CAT was described by The Independent newspaper as "the jewel in the crown of UK biotech."

== Career ==
From 1990 to 2002, Chiswell was operationally responsible for running CAT. From 1996 until 2002, Chiswell was the company's CEO. After he left CAT he devoted himself to growing the British biosciences industry, serving as the chairman of the BioIndustry Association from 2003 to 2005.

In 2003, Chiswell became chairman of the BioIndustry Association, and in June 2006 was awarded an OBE for services to the UK Bioscience Industry in the UK and Overseas. He also was included in Reed Exhibitions' list of the Top 100 Living Contributors to Biotechnology.
