= Bertilimumab =

Chemical compound

Monoclonal antibody
- Type: Whole antibody
- Source: Human
- Target: CCL11 (eotaxin-1)

Clinical data
- ATC code: none

Identifiers
- CAS Number: 375348-49-5
- ChemSpider: none
- UNII: 60879E4NED

Bertilimumab is a human monoclonal antibody that binds to eotaxin-1, an important regulator of overall eosinophil function.

It was discovered by Cambridge Antibody Technology using their phage display technology. Named CAT-213 during early discovery and development by CAT, it was to be used to treat severe allergic disorders.

In January 2007, CAT licensed the drug for treatment of allergy disorders to iCo Therapeutics Inc. iCo Therapeutics Inc. is a Vancouver-based reprofiling company focused on redosing or reformulating drugs with clinical history for new or expanded indications - a so-called 'search and development company'.

iCo Therapeutics Inc. renamed the drug from CAT-213 to iCo-008 and, at that stage, planned to initiate a Phase II clinical trial in patients with vernal keratoconjunctivitis.

In March 2008, iCo announced iCo-008 had been in 126 patients in Phase I and II clinical trials. The drug substance had been manufactured by Lonza, in its cGMP facilities in Slough, UK. Subsequently, iCo moved the drug substance to a fill-finish site for the final stage of manufacturing. iCo reported that the iCo-008 drug product was within specifications and contained a high antibody yield.
