= Fresolimumab =

Monoclonal antibody

Monoclonal antibody
- Type: Whole antibody
- Source: Human
- Target: TGF beta 1, 2 and 3

Clinical data
- ATC code: none

Legal status
- Legal status: Investigational

Identifiers
- CAS Number: 948564-73-6
- ChemSpider: none
- UNII: 375142VBIA
- KEGG: D09620

Chemical and physical data
- Formula: C_{6392}H_{9926}N_{1698}O_{2026}S_{44}
- Molar mass: 144388.22 g·mol^{−1}

Fresolimumab (GC1008) is a human monoclonal antibody and an immunomodulator. It is intended for the treatment of idiopathic pulmonary fibrosis (IPF), focal segmental glomerulosclerosis, and cancer (kidney cancer and melanoma).

It binds to and inhibits all isoforms of the protein transforming growth factor beta (TGF-β).

== History ==
Fresolimumab was discovered by Cambridge Antibody Technology (CAT) scientists and was one of a pair of candidate drugs that were identified for the treatment of the fatal condition scleroderma. CAT chose to co-develop the two drugs metelimumab (CAT-192) and fresolimumab with Genzyme. During early development, around 2004, CAT decided to drop development of metelimumab in favour of fresolimumab.

In February 2011 Sanofi-Aventis agreed to buy Genzyme for US$20.1 billion.

As of June 2011 the drug was being tested in humans (clinical trials) against IPF, renal disease, and cancer. On 13 August 2012, Genzyme applied to begin a Phase 2 clinical trial in primary focal segmental glomerulosclerosis comparing fresolimumab versus placebo.

As of July 2014, Sanofi-Aventis continue to list fresolimumab in their research and development portfolio under Phase II development.
