= Anti-CD22 immunotoxin =

Monoclonal antibody

An anti-CD22 immunotoxin is a monoclonal antibody targeting CD22 linked to a cytotoxic agent. As of August 2009, it was studied in the treatment of some types of B-cell cancer. It binds to CD22, a receptor protein on the surface of normal B cells and B-cell tumors, and, upon internalization, kills the cells, acting as immunotoxin.

== Therapeutic immunotoxins that use Pseudomonas exotoxin ==
As of August 2009, several anti-CD22 immunotoxins are undergoing clinical trials.

=== CAT-3888 and CAT-8015 ===
CAT-3888 or BL22 is an anti-CD22 immunotoxin and in 2015 completed a Phase I clinical (human) trial for the treatment of hairy cell leukemia at the NIH in the U.S.

Technically, CAT-3888 is an anti-CD22 immunotoxin fusion protein between a murine anti-CD22 disulfide-linked Fv (dsFv) antibody fragment and an edited copy of bacterial Pseudomonas exotoxin PE38. The toxin is activated intracellularly, by the low pH of the lysosome into which the entire protein was internalized via the CD22 receptor. The toxin kills the targeted cell through ribosome inactivation.

CAT-3888 was initially designed and produced at the U.S. National Cancer Institute, one of the agencies which make up the NIH. As of 2005, early development of BL22 was funded by California biotech Genencor.

In 2001, results of remissions in a phase I trial for leukemia were reported.

CAT-3888 was succeeded by moxetumomab pasudotox (CAT-8015, HA22), an anti-CD22 immunotoxin comprising a modified Pseudomonas exotoxin and an anti-CD22 antibody fragment.

Like CAT-3888, CAT-8015 changes three amino acids in the antibody fragment to increase the binding affinity for the target molecule. Both of these proteins are designed to bind to the same part of the CD22 receptor on the surface of B cells.

Research is being carried on directly by Dr. Robert J. Kreitman at the National Cancer Institute. The patent holder is MedImmune, a subsidiary of AstraZeneca. MedImmune discontinued development of CAT-3888 in 2008 and continues to develop CAT-8015.

Early Phase I results find that CAT-8015 exhibits a greater affinity for CD22 than CAT-3888. It may be useful against any B cell leukemia or lymphoma, and indeed is currently in a Phase I clinical trial, also at NIH, in patients with non-Hodgkin's lymphoma and chronic lymphocytic leukemia (CLL).

Cambridge Antibody Technology acquired CAT-3888 and CAT-8015 in 2005 from Genencor, a subsidiary of Danisco (where they were known as GCR-3888 and GCR-8015). CAT was then purchased in 2007 by British pharmaceutical company AstraZeneca for $15.2 billion. AstraZeneca consolidated its biologics portfolio in MedImmune and Cambridge Antibody Technology which was rebranded to create a dedicated biologics division known as 'MedImmune'.

=== CAT-5001 ===
CAT-5001 (formerly SS1P) is a Pseudomonas exotoxin immunotoxin that targets mesothelin, which is a cell surface glycoprotein present on normal mesothelial cells that is overexpressed in numerous cancers including pleural and peritoneal mesothelioma, ovarian cancer and pancreatic cancer. Cambridge Antibody Technology acquired CAT-5001 from Enzon Pharmaceuticals in May 2006.
