= George Smith (chemist) =

American biologist, Nobel laureate (born 1941)

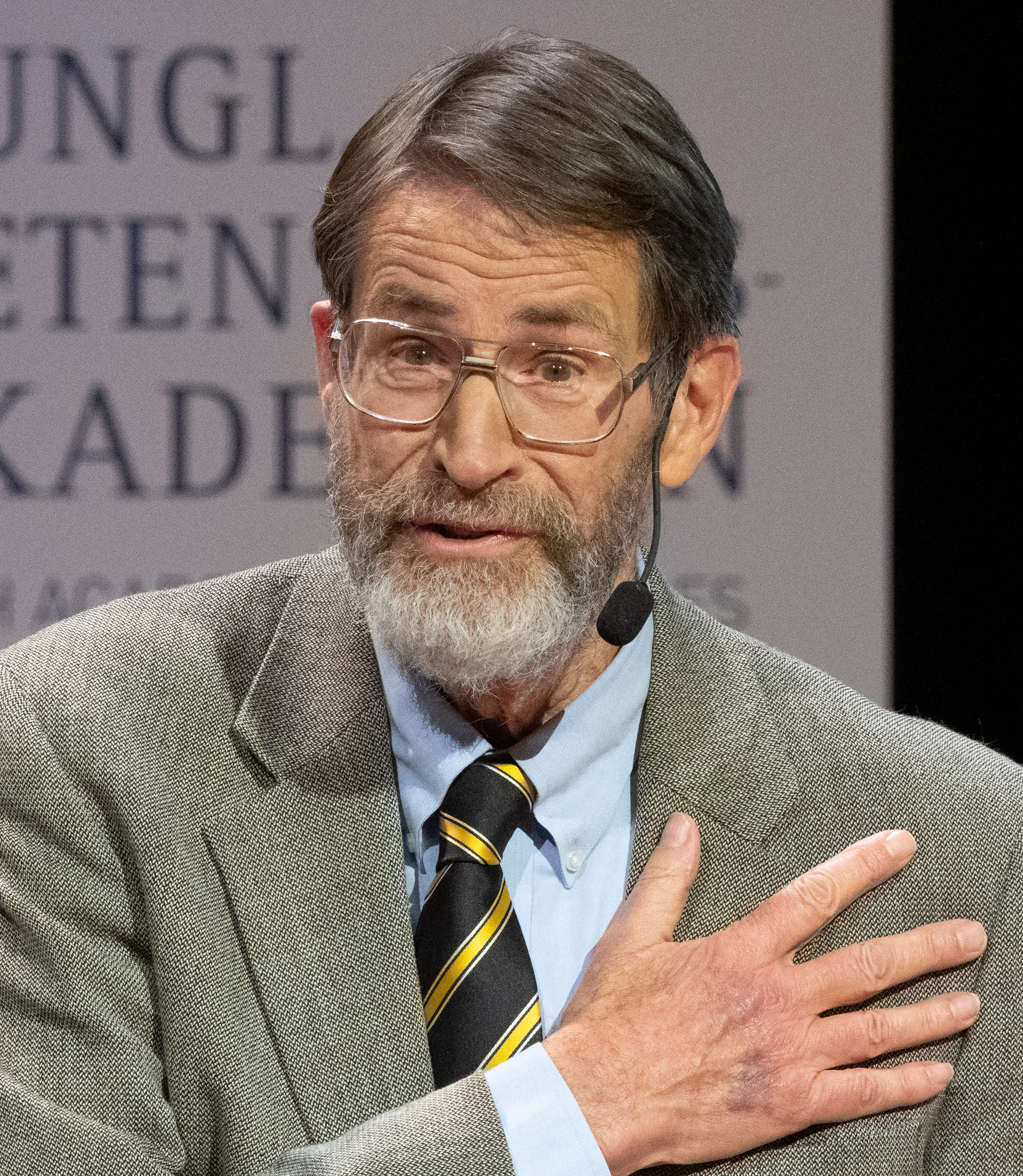
- Smith during Nobel press conference in Stockholm, December 2018
- Born: George Pearson Smith; 10 March 1941 (age 85); Norwalk, Connecticut, U.S.
- Education: Haverford College (AB); Harvard University (PhD)
- Known for: Phage display
- Spouse: Marjorie Sable
- Awards: 2018 Nobel Prize in Chemistry
- Scientific career
- Fields: Biochemistry; Biology
- Institutions: Professor, University of Missouri; Visiting Professor, Duke University; Postdoctoral Scholar, University of Wisconsin–Madison
- Thesis: The variation and adaptive expression of antibodies. (1970)
- Doctoral advisor: Edgar Haber

George Pearson Smith (born 10 March 1941) is an American biologist and Nobel laureate. He is a Curators' Distinguished Professor Emeritus of Biological Sciences at the University of Missouri in Columbia, Missouri, US.

== Career ==
Born in Norwalk, Connecticut, he earned his A.B. degree from Haverford College in biology, was a high school teacher and lab technician for a year, and earned his PhD degree in bacteriology and immunology from Harvard University. He was a postdoc at the University of Wisconsin (with future Nobel laureate Oliver Smithies) before moving to Columbia, Missouri and joining the University of Missouri faculty in 1975. He spent the 1983–1984 academic year at Duke University with Robert Webster where he began the work that led to him being awarded a Nobel Prize.

He is best known for phage display, a technique where a specific protein sequence is artificially inserted into the coat protein gene of a bacteriophage, causing the protein to be expressed on the outside of the bacteriophage. Smith first described the technique in 1985 when he displayed peptides on filamentous phage by fusing the peptide of interest onto gene III of filamentous phage. He was awarded the 2018 Nobel Prize in Chemistry for this work, sharing his prize with Greg Winter and Frances Arnold.

== Human rights advocacy ==
Smith is an advocate for equal rights for Palestinians and Israeli Jews in their common homeland, and a strong supporter of the Boycott, Divestment and Sanctions movement. On the topic of religion, Smith is quoted as saying "I'm not religious or Jewish by birth. But my wife is Jewish and our sons are bar-mitzvahed, and I'm very engaged with Jewish culture and politics."

== Awards and honors ==
- 2000 University of Missouri Curators' Professor
- 2001 Elected Fellow – American Association for the Advancement of Science (AAAS)
- 2007 American Society for Microbiology Promega Biotechnology Research Award
- 2018 Nobel Prize in Chemistry together with Greg Winter and Frances Arnold
- 2020 Elected Member – United States National Academy of Sciences (NAS)
- 2023 Inaugural Mizzou Medal of Distinction – University of Missouri College of Arts and Sciences
