= Tralokinumab =

Monoclonal antibody

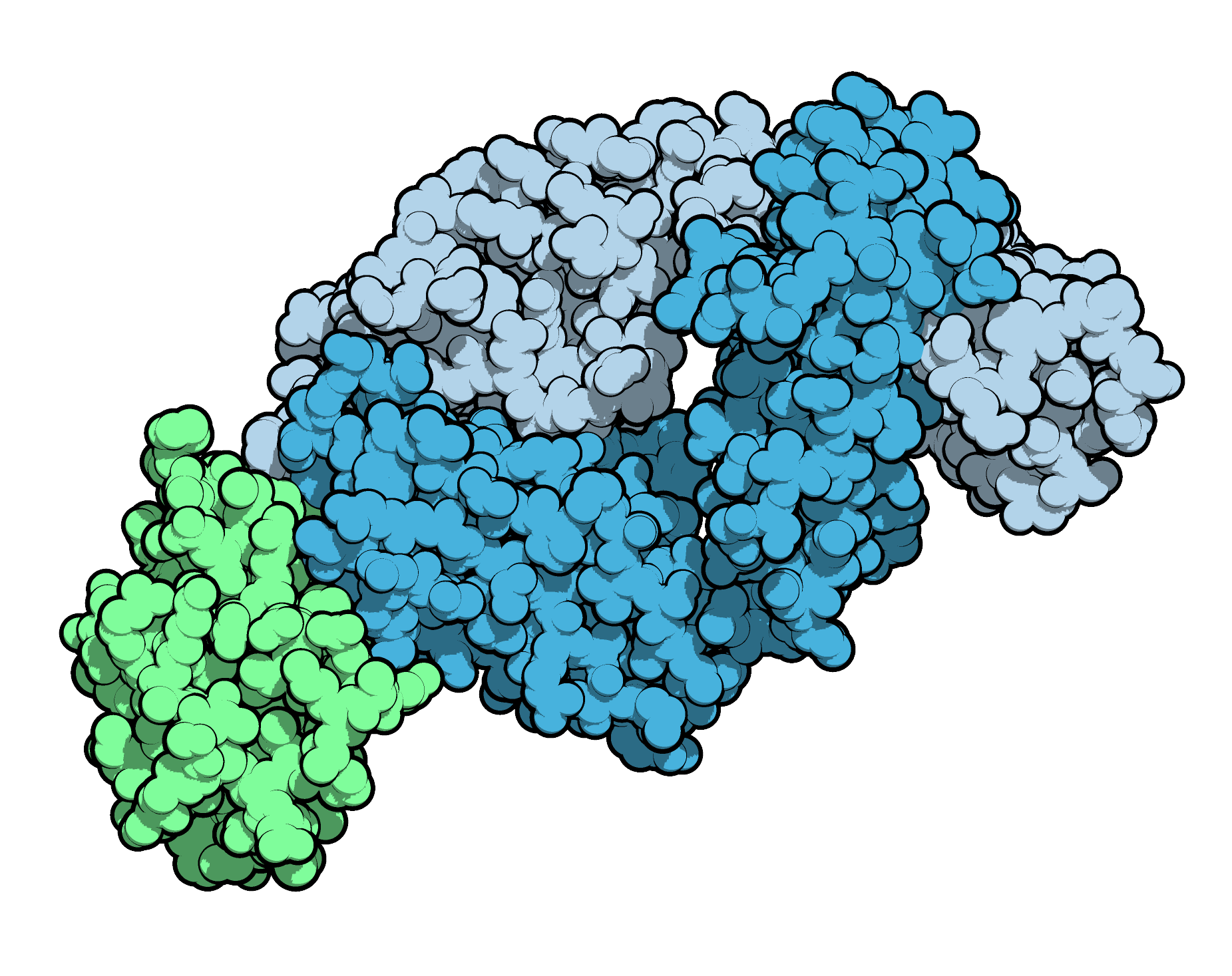
- Tralokinumab Fab fragment bound to IL-13. From PDB 5L6Y.

Monoclonal antibody
- Type: Whole antibody
- Source: Human
- Target: IL-13

Clinical data
- Pronunciation: /ˌtreɪləˈkɪnjʊmæb/ TRAY-lə-KIN-yuu-mab
- Trade names: Adtralza, Adbry
- Other names: CAT-354, tralokinumab-ldrm
- License data: US DailyMed: Tralokinumab
- Routes of administration: Subcutaneous
- ATC code: D11AH07 (WHO)

Legal status
- Legal status: CA: ℞-only / Schedule D; UK: POM (Prescription only); US: ℞-only; EU: Rx-only; Rx-only

Identifiers
- CAS Number: 1044515-88-9
- DrugBank: DB12169
- ChemSpider: none
- UNII: GK1LYB375A
- KEGG: D09979

Chemical and physical data
- Formula: C_{6374}H_{9822}N_{1698}O_{2014}S_{44}
- Molar mass: 143875.20 g·mol^{−1}

Tralokinumab sold under the brand names Adtralza (EU/UK) and Adbry (US) among others, is a human monoclonal antibody used for the treatment of atopic dermatitis. Tralokinumab targets the cytokine interleukin 13.

The most common side effects include upper respiratory tract infections (colds and other infections of the nose and throat), reactions at the injection site, and redness and discomfort in the eye.

Tralokinumab was approved for medical use in the European Union and in the United Kingdom in June 2021. It was approved for medical use in the United States in December 2021. The U.S. Food and Drug Administration (FDA) considers it to be a first-in-class medication.

== Medical uses ==
Tralokinumab is indicated for the treatment of moderate-to-severe atopic dermatitis in adults who are candidates for systemic therapy.

In the United States, tralokinumab is indicated for the treatment of moderate-to-severe atopic dermatitis in adults whose disease is not adequately controlled with topical prescription therapies or when those therapies are not advisable.

== Discovery and development ==
Tralokinumab was discovered by Cambridge Antibody Technology scientists using protein optimization based on Ribosome Display. They used the extensive data sets from ribosome display to patent protect CAT-354 in a world-first of sequence-activity-relationship claims. In 2004, clinical development of CAT-354 was initiated with this first study completing in 2005. On 21 July 2011, MedImmune LLC initiated a Phase IIb, randomized, double-blind study to evaluate the efficacy of tralokinumab in adults with asthma.

In 2016, MedImmune and AstraZeneca started developing tralokinumab for asthma (Phase III) and atopic dermatitis (Phase IIb) while clinical development for moderate-to-severe ulcerative colitis and idiopathic pulmonary fibrosis (IPF) have been discontinued. In July of that year AstraZeneca licensed tralokinumab to Leo Pharma for skin diseases.

A phase IIb study of tralokinumab found that treatment was associated with early and sustained improvements in atopic dermatitis symptoms and tralokinumab had an acceptable safety and tolerability profile, thereby providing evidence for targeting IL-13 in patients with atopic dermatitis.

In June 2017, Leo Pharma started phase III clinical trials with tralokinumab in atopic dermatitis.

== Society and culture ==
=== Legal status ===
In April 2021, the Committee for Medicinal Products for Human Use of the European Medicines Agency adopted a positive opinion, recommending the granting of a marketing authorization for the medicinal product Adtralza, intended for the treatment of moderate‑to‑severe atopic dermatitis. The applicant for this medicinal product is LEO Pharma A/S. Tralokinumab was approved for medical use in the European Union in June 2021.

=== Names ===
Tralokinumab is the international nonproprietary name (INN) and the United States Adopted Name (USAN).
