= Lerdelimumab =

Monoclonal antibody

Monoclonal antibody
- Type: Whole antibody
- Source: Human
- Target: TGF beta 2

Clinical data
- ATC code: none

Legal status
- Legal status: Development discontinued

Identifiers
- CAS Number: 285985-06-0
- ChemSpider: none
- UNII: GX1FEU3QSM

Lerdelimumab (CAT-152, intended trade name Trabio) is a human monoclonal antibody and an immunosuppressive drug targeting TGF beta 2.

It was being developed to reduce scarring after glaucoma drainage surgery. Development was stopped in late 2005 after unsuccessful trial results for that condition.
