= CD22 =

Lectin molecule

Identifiers
- Aliases: CD22, SIGLEC-2, SIGLEC2, CD22 molecule
- External IDs: OMIM: 107266; MGI: 88322; GeneCards: CD22

Gene location (Mouse)
Chr.	Chromosome 7 (mouse)
Band	7 B1|7 19.26 cM	Start	30,564,827 bp
Band	7 B1|7 19.26 cM	End	30,579,767 bp
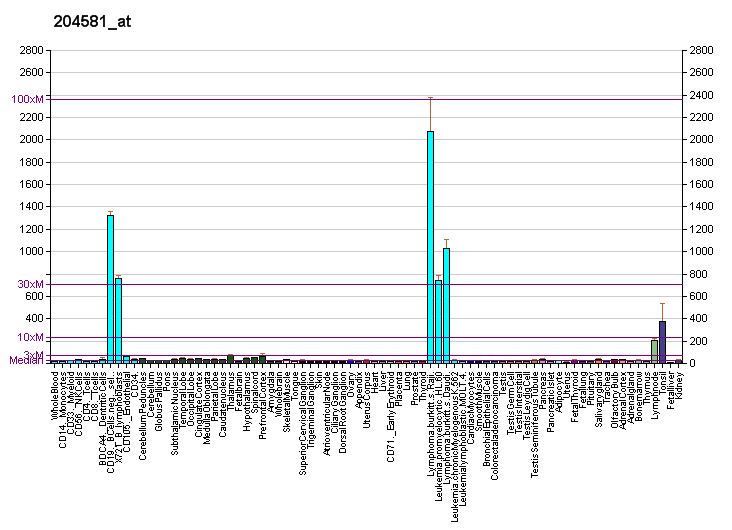

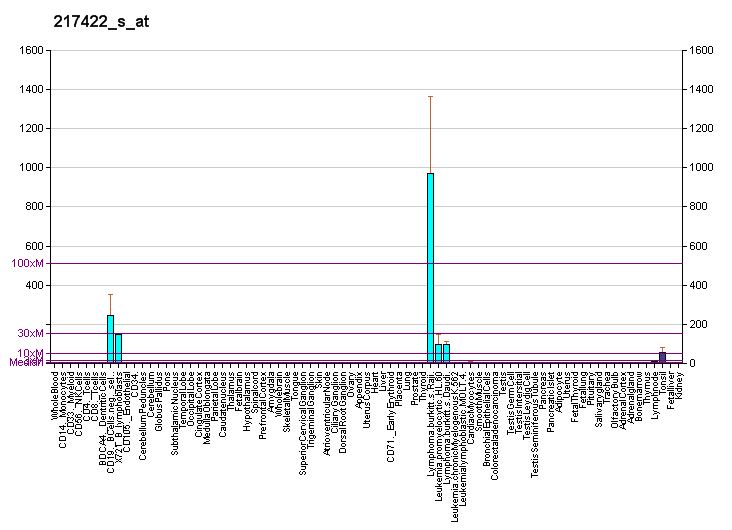

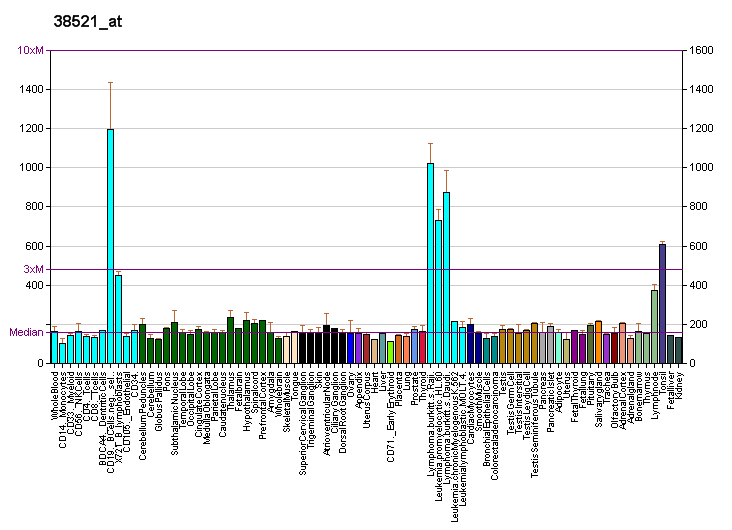
RNA expression pattern
Bgee	Human / Mouse (ortholog); Top expressed in: spleen; appendix; lymph node; right uterine tube; sural nerve; corpus callosum; putamen; inferior olivary nucleus; caudate nucleus; amygdala / Top expressed in: spleen; mesenteric lymph nodes; blood; tibiofemoral joint; subcutaneous adipose tissue; submandibular gland; granulocyte; calvaria; morula; tunica adventitia of aorta; More reference expression data
BioGPS	More reference expression data
Gene ontology
Molecular function	protein binding; carbohydrate binding; IgM binding; signaling receptor binding; protein phosphatase binding; sialic acid binding; CD4 receptor binding
Cellular component	integral component of membrane; plasma membrane; extracellular exosome; membrane; cytoplasm; early endosome; cell surface; neuronal cell body membrane; recycling endosome
Biological process	cell adhesion; regulation of endocytosis; regulation of B cell proliferation; B cell activation; regulation of immune response; negative regulation of calcium-mediated signaling; negative regulation of B cell receptor signaling pathway
Sources:Amigo / QuickGO
Orthologs
Databases	NCBI: entry
Species	Human	Mouse
Entrez	933	12483
Ensembl	n/a	ENSMUSG00000030577
UniProt	P20273	P35329
RefSeq (mRNA)	NM_024916; NM_001185099; NM_001185100; NM_001185101; NM_001278417 NM_001771	NM_001043317; NM_009845
RefSeq (protein)	NP_001172028; NP_001172029; NP_001172030; NP_001265346; NP_001762	NP_001036782; NP_033975
Location (UCSC)	n/a	Chr 7: 30.56 – 30.58 Mb
PubMed search
- Wikidata
View/Edit Human	View/Edit Mouse

CD22, or cluster of differentiation-22, is a molecule belonging to the SIGLEC family of lectins. It is found on the surface of mature B cells and to a lesser extent on some immature B cells. Generally speaking, CD22 is a regulatory molecule that prevents the overactivation of the immune system and the development of autoimmune diseases.

CD22 is a sugar binding transmembrane protein, which specifically binds sialic acid with an immunoglobulin (Ig) domain located at its N-terminus. The presence of Ig domains makes CD22 a member of the immunoglobulin superfamily. CD22 functions as an inhibitory receptor for B cell receptor (BCR) signaling. It is also involved in the B cell trafficking to Peyer's patches in mice. In mice, it has been shown that CD22 blockade restores homeostatic microglial phagocytosis in aging brains.

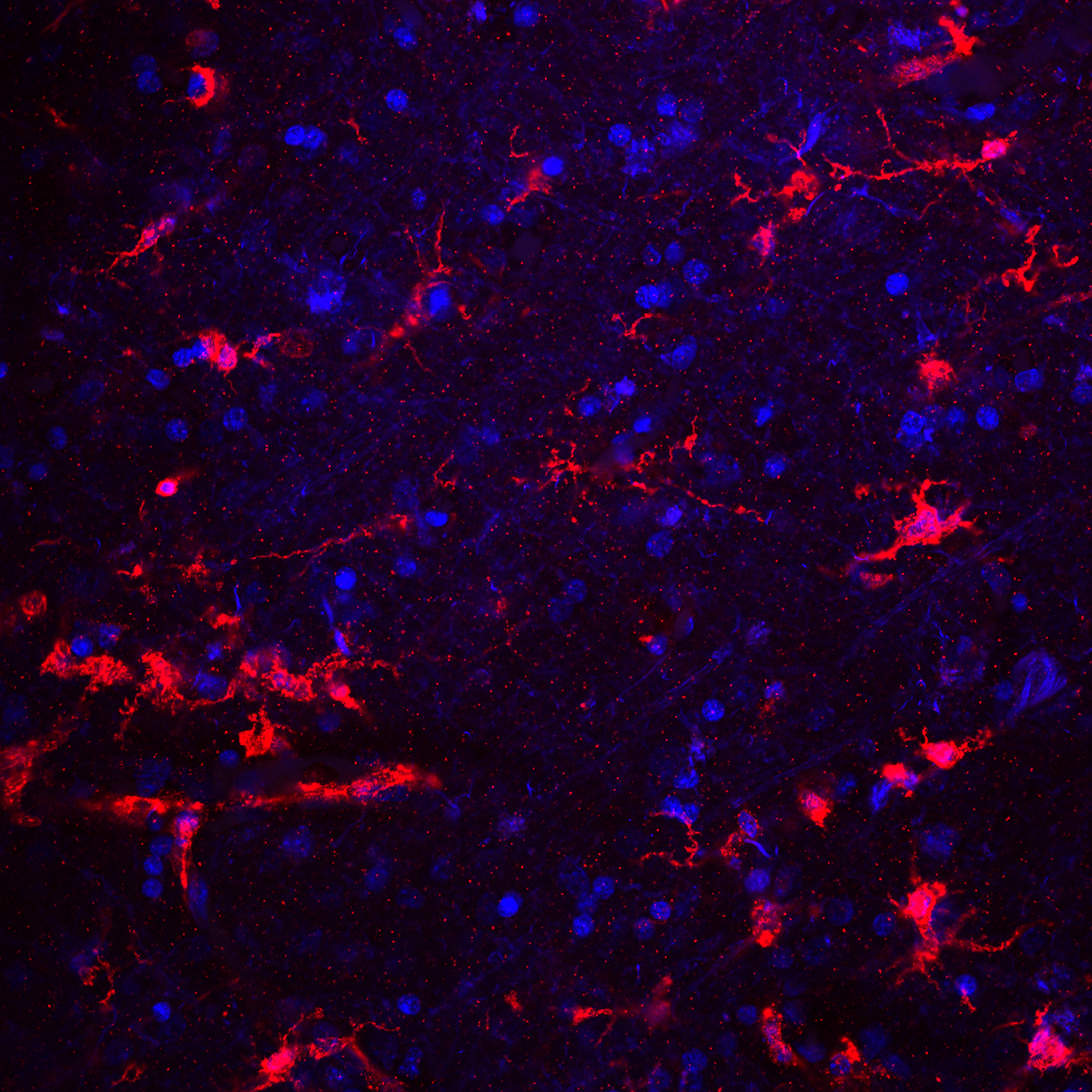
image of microglia

== Structure ==
CD22 is a transmembrane protein with a molecular weight of 140 kDa. The extracellular part of CD22 consists of seven immunoglobulin domains and the intracellular part is formed by 141-amino acid cytoplasmic tail.

=== Extracellular part ===
The binding site for ligands is located at the extracellular N-terminus, specifically at the last immunoglobulin domain called the V-like domain. This domain binds to ligands containing sialic acid via α2,6-linkage to the galactose residue. Such ligands are commonly expressed on the surface of erythrocytes, monocytes, cytokine-activated endothelial cells, T cells and B cells. To a lesser extent they are present on soluble IgM and on the soluble plasmatic glycoprotein called haptoglobin. Therefore, CD22 can bind ligands in the cis configuration, when they are on the surface of B cells, or in the trans configuration, when they are on the surface of other cells or on soluble glycoproteins or attached to a cell-associated antigen. However, CD22 is masked on most B-cell surfaces, meaning that it cannot bind exogenous ligands, so cis interaction with glycoprotein ligands on the same cell is preferred.

==== Trans ligands ====
Trans interactions between CD22 and its ligands are important for B cell adhesion and migration. Specifically, CD22-deficient mice have been shown to have reduced numbers of recirculating B cells and reduced numbers of IgM-secreting plasma cells in the bone marrow. Together, this implies that CD22 interacting with trans ligands is crucial for the homing of mature, recirculating B cells to the bone marrow.

== BCR signaling ==
The intracellular part of CD22 consists of 6 tyrosine residues which contain both ITIM and ITAM motifs suggesting both inhibitory and activation role in signaling. Because of the tyrosine residues, the cytoplasmic domain of CD22 can be phosphorylated. This happens when the BCR is cross-linked by the antigen. Phosphorylation is mediated by Lyn, a protein tyrosine kinase (PTK) of the Src family found in lipid rafts.

=== Inhibitory role ===
After CD22 is phosphorylated, the ITIM motifs provide docking sites for the SH2 domain containing protein tyrosine phosphatase called SHP-1. SHP-1 inhibits mitogen-activated protein kinase (MAPK) and dephosphorylates components of BCR signaling. That means that association of CD22 with SHP-1 leads to the inhibition of BCR signaling.

=== Activation role ===
After CD22 is phosphorylated, the ITAM motifs provide docking sites for the SH2 domain of Lyn or other Syk kinase or Src-family tyrosine kinases. Thus, CD22 positively regulates BCR signaling and thereby promotes B cell survival.

== Autoimmunity ==
Single-nucleotide polymorphisms in the CD22 gene lead to a higher likelihood of autoimmune disease. Specifically, some studies show that polymorphisms in the CD22 gene are associated with susceptibility to systemic lupus erythematosus (SLE) and cutaneous systemic sclerosis. In addition, mutations in enzymes involved in the glycosylation of the CD22 ligand may also lead to the susceptibility to autoimmune diseases. Specifically, mutations in the sialic acid esterase were frequently found in patients with rheumatoid arthritis and SLE. This enzyme is essential for deacetylation of the N-glycan sialic acid present in CD22 ligands and is therefore crucial for ligand binding.

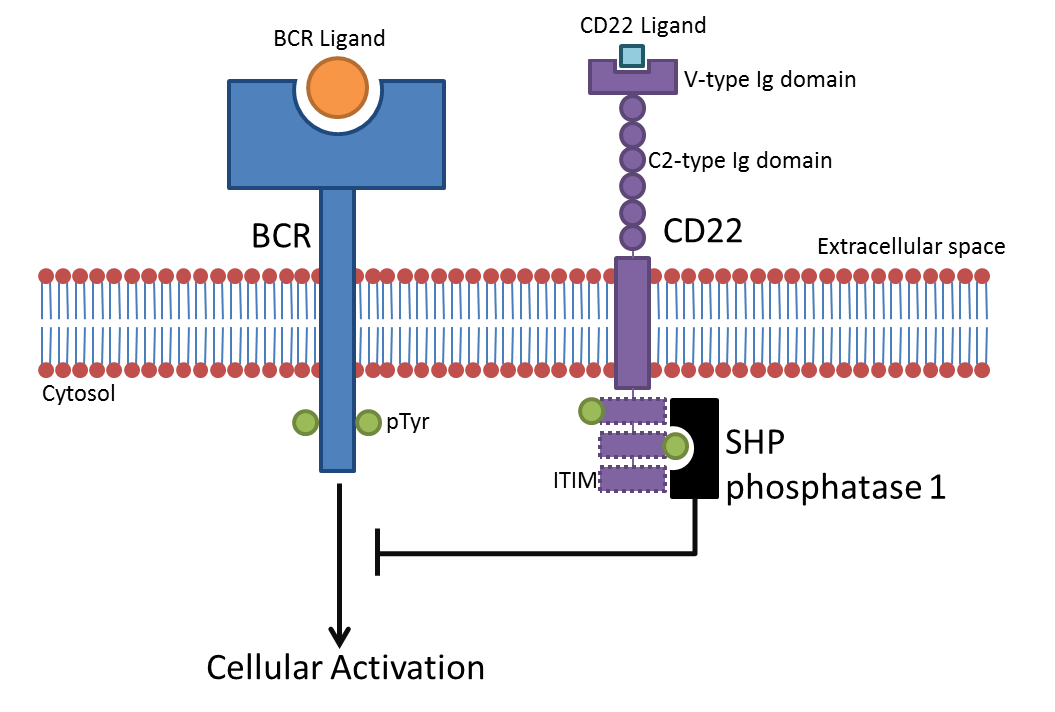
BCR signaling & inhibitory role

== As a drug target ==
Because CD22 is restricted to B cells, it is an excellent target for immunotherapy of B cell malignancies. There are several mechanisms by which this can be achieved, namely monoclonal antibodies, bispecific antibodies, antibody-drug conjugates, radioimmunoconjugates or CAR-T cells.

An immunotoxin, BL22 (CAT-3888), that targets this receptor was developed at the NIH. BL22 was superseded by moxetumomab pasudotox (HA22, CAT-8015). Moxetumomab pasudotox is approved in the EU and USA for treatment of relapsed or refractory hairy cell leukemia.

=== Inotuzumab ===
It was shown that antibody-drug conjugates work better than naked antibodies. The reason is that CD22 is rapidly internalized rather than being exposed to the extracellular environment making it more suitable for specific delivery of these conjugates. One of such therapeutics is inotuzumab, which was approved by the FDA for the treatment of relapsed or refractory B cell acute lymphoblastic leukemia in August 2017. Inotuzumab consists of a CD22-targeting immunoglobulin G4 humanized monoclonal antibody conjugated to calicheamicin. The mechanism by which calicheamicin destroys malignant cells is that it binds to DNA, causing DNA double-strand breaks, and this in turn leads to transcription inhibition.

== Interactions ==
CD22 has been shown to interact with Grb2, PTPN6, LYN, SHC1 and INPP5D.
