= Edgar Haber =

Research physician

- Born: 1 February 1932; Berlin, Germany
- Died: October 13, 1997 (aged 65)
- Education: Columbia University
- Scientific career
- Fields: Medicine
- Workplaces: Massachusetts General Hospital

Edgar Haber (February 1, 1932 – October 13, 1997), was a research physician specializing in cardiology, immunology, and molecular biology. He was, at times, Chief of Cardiology at the Massachusetts General Hospital, Higgins Professor of Medicine at Harvard Medical School, President of the Bristol-Myers Squibb Pharmaceutical Research Institute, and Director of the Center for the Prevention of Cardiovascular Disease at the Harvard School of Public Health. He published more than 550 research papers in cardiology, immunology, and molecular biology, and edited The Practice of Cardiology (1980, 1988), at the time the definitive text on the subject.

== Early life ==
Edgar Haber was born in Berlin, Germany, to Sigmund (Fred) Haber (June 26, 1897 – July 7, 1960), a physician, and Devorah (Dorothy) Bernstein Haber (March 19, 1904 or 1909 – June 30, 1999). The rise to power of the Nazis soon thereafter led his family to seek to leave Germany, but his mother's Lithuanian origin prevented them from coming directly to the United States. They moved to British Palestine in 1933, where his younger sister Ruth Haber Jonas was born. His family was finally permitted entrance to the United States in March, 1939 where they lived in New York City for nine months while his father studied and took a qualifying exam to be a physician in the US. They subsequently settled in Yonkers, New York, where his father established a medical practice.

== Education ==
Edgar Haber attended the Horace Mann School, graduating in 1949, received an AB from Columbia College, Columbia University in 1952, and an MD from the Columbia College of Physicians and Surgeons in 1956.

== Family ==
Edgar Haber was married to Carol Ellen Avery on November 16, 1958, in Bethesda, Maryland. They had three children: Justin Avery Haber (b. 1961), Graham Stickney Haber (1963-2021), and Eben Merriam Haber (b. 1966).

== Medical and research career ==
Edgar Haber's career included positions at the National Institutes of Health (1958–1961), the Massachusetts General Hospital (1964–1988), the pharmaceutical companies Squibb and Bristol-Myers-Squibb (1988–1991), and the Harvard School of Public Health (1991–1997).
