= Asset-centricity =

Asset-centricity is an approach to investing in the life sciences field with a focus on key assets, such as a pharmaceutical molecule that could form the basis for a novel new drug which has already been identified, rather than on discovering such assets through basic research & development.

The asset-centric investing model is an attempt to streamline the drug discovery process, based on the widely held belief that it has become too expensive. It de-couples life sciences assets from the infrastructure necessary to develop them, with the goal of improving returns on invested capital.

A typical asset-centric startup company would have a single asset, or sometimes two, with a team of experts, including drug developers, shared across a back-end structure and across a variety of portfolio life sciences companies. These team members would coalesce for specific, focused drug-discovery projects The bulk of funding would support the development of the primary asset, with the rest supporting a secondary asset and infrastructure.

== History ==
The asset-centric model of investing was developed by Index Ventures, a venture capital firm. Forms of the asset-centric model have subsequently been adopted by other life sciences investment firms such as Atlas Venture and Symphony Capital.

== Examples of Asset-Centric companies ==
Examples of life sciences companies built on the asset-centric investing model include:

- Aegerion Pharmaceuticals (Nasdaq: AEGR)
- Arteas Therapeutics (acquired by Eli Lilly)
- OncoEthix (acquired by Merck & Co.)
- Pangenetics (acquired by AbbVie)
- XO1 Limited (acquired by Janssen Pharmaceuticals)
