= TGF beta 2 =

Protein found in humans

TGFB2
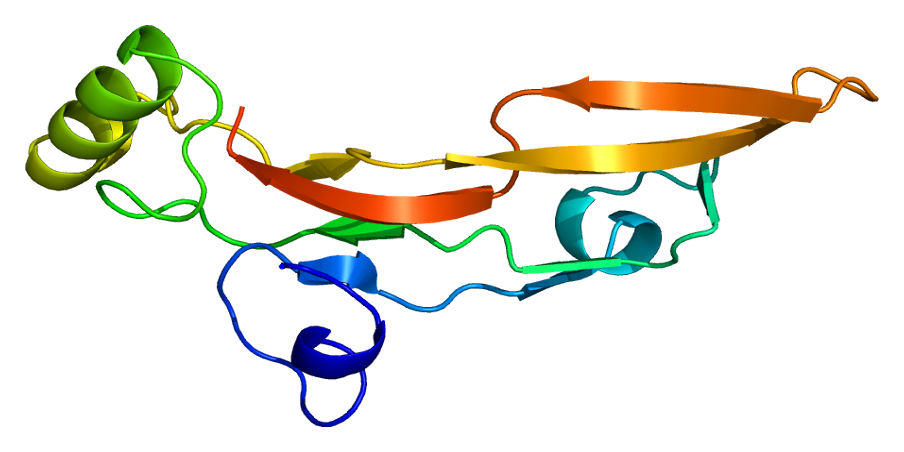

Identifiers
- Aliases: TGFB2, TGF-beta2, transforming growth factor beta 2, G-TSF
- External IDs: OMIM: 190220; MGI: 98726; GeneCards: TGFB2
Available structures
PDB	Ortholog search: PDBe RCSB
PDB	List of PDB id codes 1TFG, 2TGI, 4KXZ

Gene location (Human)
Chr.	Chromosome 1 (human)
Band	1q41	Start	218,345,336 bp
Band	1q41	End	218,444,619 bp

Gene location (Mouse)
Chr.	Chromosome 1 (mouse)
Band	1 H5|1 89.95 cM	Start	186,354,989 bp
Band	1 H5|1 89.95 cM	End	186,438,186 bp
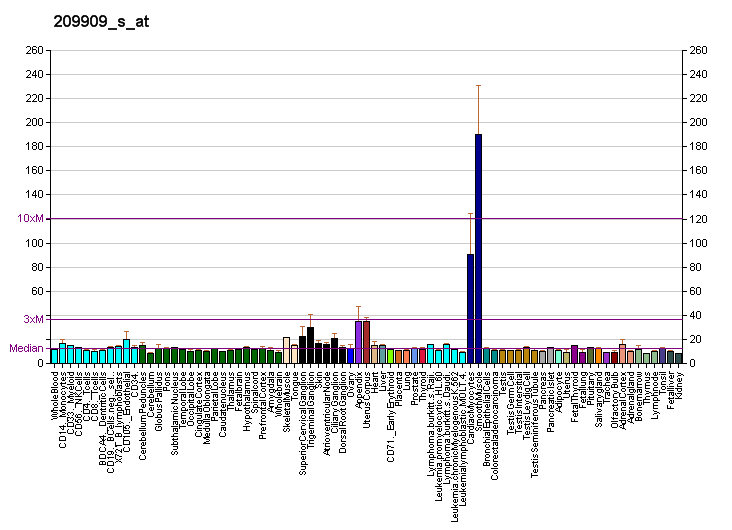

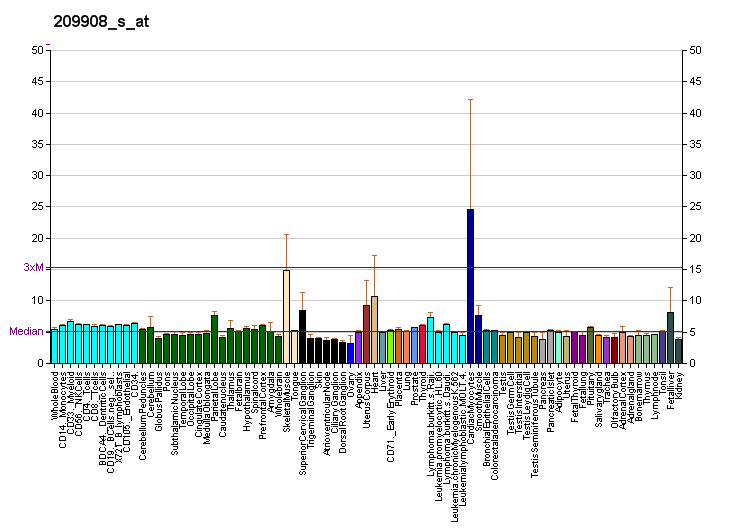

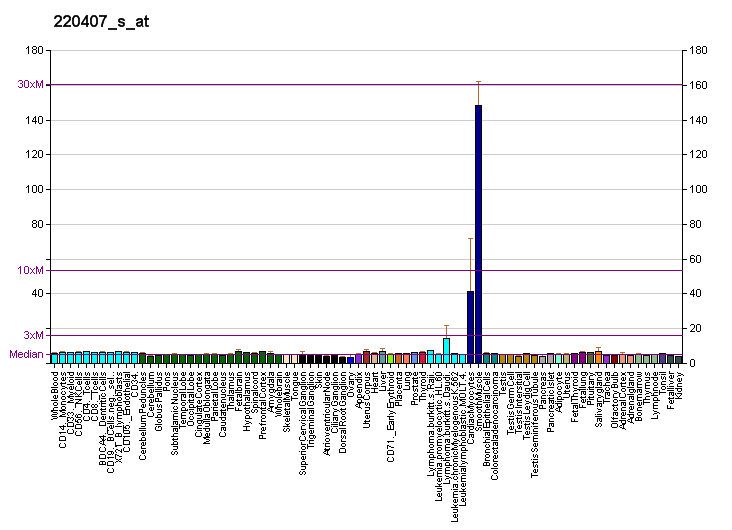
RNA expression pattern
Bgee	Human / Mouse (ortholog); Top expressed in: Achilles tendon; cartilage tissue; germinal epithelium; tendon of biceps brachii; sperm; minor salivary glands; ventricular zone; tibia; islet of Langerhans; smooth muscle tissue / Top expressed in: epithelium of lens; decidua; ciliary body; iris; external carotid artery; secondary oocyte; internal carotid artery; Epithelium of choroid plexus; semi-lunar valve; submandibular gland; More reference expression data
BioGPS	More reference expression data
Gene ontology
Molecular function	type II transforming growth factor beta receptor binding; signaling receptor binding; type III transforming growth factor beta receptor binding; cytokine activity; transforming growth factor beta receptor binding; growth factor activity; protein homodimerization activity; amyloid-beta binding; protein binding; protein heterodimerization activity
Cellular component	extracellular region; extracellular matrix; platelet alpha granule lumen; extracellular space; axon; soma; collagen-containing extracellular matrix
Biological process	eye development; regulation of transforming growth factor beta2 production; response to progesterone; cell death; cardioblast differentiation; positive regulation of integrin biosynthetic process; protein phosphorylation; positive regulation of heart contraction; positive regulation of neuron apoptotic process; angiogenesis; negative regulation of epithelial cell proliferation; uterine wall breakdown; negative regulation of alkaline phosphatase activity; negative regulation of macrophage cytokine production; positive regulation of cell adhesion mediated by integrin; cell population proliferation; transforming growth factor beta receptor signaling pathway; negative regulation of cell population proliferation; positive regulation of stress-activated MAPK cascade; cell-cell junction organization; extrinsic apoptotic signaling pathway; collagen fibril organization; positive regulation of epithelial cell migration; neutrophil chemotaxis; positive regulation of cell growth; response to wounding; negative regulation of cell growth; positive regulation of cardioblast differentiation; glial cell migration; wound healing; positive regulation of ossification; cardiac muscle cell proliferation; positive regulation of epithelial to mesenchymal transition; odontogenesis; positive regulation of timing of catagen; positive regulation of immune response; regulation of complement-dependent cytotoxicity; positive regulation of protein secretion; epithelial to mesenchymal transition; embryonic digestive tract development; response to hypoxia; cell-cell signaling; positive regulation of pathway-restricted SMAD protein phosphorylation; heart morphogenesis; platelet degranulation; salivary gland morphogenesis; generation of neurons; negative regulation of immune response; cell morphogenesis; positive regulation of cell population proliferation; positive regulation of phosphatidylinositol 3-kinase signaling; cell migration; activation of protein kinase activity; positive regulation of cell division; cardiac epithelial to mesenchymal transition; BMP signaling pathway; cell development; skeletal system development; kidney development; neural tube closure; hair follicle development; outflow tract septum morphogenesis; membranous septum morphogenesis; heart valve morphogenesis; atrioventricular valve morphogenesis; pulmonary valve morphogenesis; endocardial cushion morphogenesis; cardiac right ventricle morphogenesis; ventricular trabecula myocardium morphogenesis; endocardial cushion fusion; atrial septum primum morphogenesis; neural retina development; development of the heart; male gonad development; hemopoiesis; embryonic limb morphogenesis; hair follicle morphogenesis; ascending aorta morphogenesis; dopamine biosynthetic process; positive regulation of cell cycle; negative regulation of Ras protein signal transduction; somatic stem cell division; neuron development; inner ear development; uterus development; pathway-restricted SMAD protein phosphorylation; ventricular septum morphogenesis; atrial septum morphogenesis; pharyngeal arch artery morphogenesis; regulation of apoptotic process involved in outflow tract morphogenesis; substantia propria of cornea development; cranial skeletal system development; negative regulation of epithelial to mesenchymal transition involved in endocardial cushion formation; positive regulation of epithelial to mesenchymal transition involved in endocardial cushion formation; regulation of signaling receptor activity; negative regulation of gene expression; negative regulation of angiogenesis; positive regulation of Notch signaling pathway; SMAD protein signal transduction; positive regulation of pri-miRNA transcription by RNA polymerase II; embryo development ending in birth or egg hatching; regulation of timing of catagen; secondary palate development; regulation of cell population proliferation; regulation of apoptotic process; regulation of MAPK cascade
Sources:Amigo / QuickGO
Orthologs
Databases	NCBI: entry; OMA: entry
Species	Human	Mouse
Entrez	7042	21808
Ensembl	ENSG00000092969	ENSMUSG00000039239
UniProt	P61812	P27090
RefSeq (mRNA)	NM_003238; NM_001135599	NM_009367; NM_001329107
RefSeq (protein)	NP_001129071; NP_003229	NP_001316036; NP_033393
Location (UCSC)	Chr 1: 218.35 – 218.44 Mb	Chr 1: 186.35 – 186.44 Mb
PubMed search
- Wikidata
View/Edit Human	View/Edit Mouse

Transforming growth factor-beta 2 (TGF-β2) is a secreted protein known as a cytokine that performs many cellular functions and has a vital role during embryonic development (alternative names: Glioblastoma-derived T-cell suppressor factor, G-TSF, BSC-1 cell growth inhibitor, Polyergin, Cetermin). It is an extracellular glycosylated protein. It is known to suppress the effects of interleukin dependent T-cell tumors. There are two named isoforms of this protein, created by alternative splicing of the same gene (i.e., TGFB2).
