= MedImmune =

Biopharmaceutical company, acquired by AstraZeneca in 2007

MedImmune, LLC
- Formerly: Molecular Vaccines, Inc. (1988 - 1989)
- Type: Subsidiary
- Industry: Pharmaceutical
- Founded: 1988; 38 years ago (as Molecular Vaccines, Inc.)
- Defunct: 2019; 7 years ago
- Fate: Dissolved by AstraZeneca
- Headquarters: Gaithersburg, Maryland, U.S.
- Products: Synagis; FluMist
- Parent: AstraZeneca
- Website: www.medimmune.com

MedImmune, LLC was a wholly owned subsidiary of AstraZeneca before February 14, 2019, when it was announced that the MedImmune name and branding would be discontinued in favor of AstraZeneca.

MedImmune was founded in 1988 as Molecular Vaccines, Inc, and was purchased in 2007 for $15.6 billion. Its main offices were located in Gaithersburg, MD, Cambridge, UK, and Mountain View, CA.

It produced Synagis, a drug for the prevention of respiratory infections in infants, which accounted for US$ 1.06 billion of its US$ 1.2 billion in revenue for 2005, and FluMist, a nasal spray influenza vaccine introduced in 2004. MedImmune acquired FluMist when it purchased Aviron in 2002 for US$ 1.5 billion. FluMist sales totaled US$ 104 million in 2008, US$ 54.8 million in 2007, and US$ 36.4 million in 2006.

FluMist was approved for children two years of age and older in 2007, but initially was approved only for healthy people ages 5 to 49, a significant limitation because it eliminated a significant market—young children who find injections objectionable. Sales of FluMist fell short of analysts' expectations for the first two years the drug was sold. FluMist was initially sold in a frozen form, which was difficult for doctors to store.

MedImmune conducted successful clinical trials for a new generation of FluMist needle-free vaccine, called CAIV-T, which was approved by the U.S. Food and Drug Administration (FDA) in 2007, and is now the form offered on the market.

== History ==
Molecular Vaccines, Inc. was founded by Wayne T. Hockmeyer, David Mott, and Dr. James Young in 1988. In 1989, Molecular Vaccines, Inc changed its name to MedImmune, Inc.

On April 23, 2007, it was announced MedImmune and AstraZeneca entered into a definitive agreement under which AstraZeneca intended to acquire MedImmune in an all-cash transaction at US$ 58 per share, or about US$ 15.2 billion. On 19 June 2007 AstraZeneca completed the acquisition paying US$ 15.2 billion primarily for its drug development pipeline. Analysts have criticised the take-over, claiming that AstraZeneca paid too much. AstraZeneca chose to merge MedImmune with Cambridge Antibody Technology, which it had acquired in 2006, creating a new biologics division under the MedImmune name. AstraZeneca presented the new MedImmune to investors on 7 December 2007.

In June 2007, the National Institutes of Health (NIH) began enrolling participants in a Phase 1 H5N1 study of an intranasal influenza vaccine candidate based on MedImmune's live, attenuated vaccine technology.

MedImmune said it was making a significant, rapid response with a vaccine to the novel H1N1 variant of influenza, known as swine flu. In June 2009 it won a Department of Health and Human Services (HHS) contract, worth $90m. Under the contract with HHS, MedImmune will continue to make its seasonal FluMist vaccine and also develop a vaccine targeted specifically at the novel H1N1 virus. MedImmune then won a second contract to test its nasal spray flu technology as a viable treatment for the H1N1.

MedImmune received approval from the U.S. FDA for its intranasal novel H1N1 influenza vaccine in September 2009.

== Pipeline ==
MedImmune had over 120 drugs in development for conditions including lupus, COPD, asthma, and many types of cancer. Major phase III trials included:

- durvalumab (anti-PD-L1)
- tremelimumab (anti-CTLA-4)
- moxetumomab pasudotox (anti-CD22)
- benralizumab (anti-IL-5R)
- tralokinumab (anti-IL-13)
- anifrolumab (anti-IFN-aR)
- nirsevimab (anti-RSV)

== See also ==
- MedImmune, Inc. v. Genentech, Inc.
