= Ohio State University College of Medicine =

Public medical school in Columbus, Ohio, US

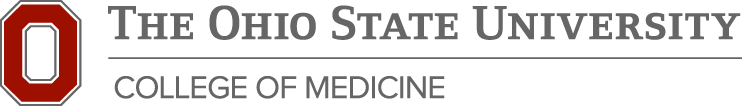
- OSU Logo
- Type: Public
- Established: 1914; 112 years ago
- Parent institution: Ohio State University
- Dean: Amy Moore, MD (Interim)
- Academic staff: 3,400+
- Students: 750
- Location: Columbus, Ohio, USA; 39.994132°N 83.016888°W
- Campus: Urban
- Website: medicine.osu.edu

The Ohio State University College of Medicine (formerly known as the Ohio State University College of Medicine and Public Health) is the medical school at Ohio State University. It is located in Columbus, Ohio. In the past, the college has been recognized as an important institution in research, as reflected by rankings in U.S. News & World Report, Tier 1 (Top 16) in Best Medical Schools: Research. In 2024, its two primary teaching hospitals (The Ohio State University Wexner Medical Center and Nationwide Children's Hospital) were ranked among the best hospitals in the US; the former in 9 specialties (but with only one specialty ranked in the Top 20 nationally), and the latter in 10 different specialties. Nationwide Children's Hospital was also named to U.S. News & World Report's select honor roll of US Best Children's hospitals.

== History ==
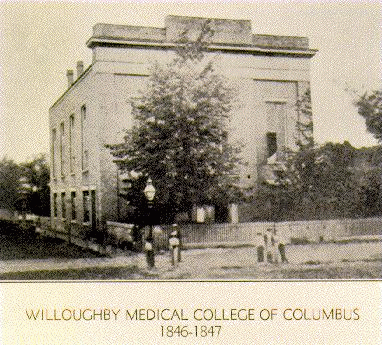
Willoughby Medical College of Columbus

The OSU College of Medicine can trace its roots as far back as March 3, 1834, with the founding of the Willoughby University of Lake Erie in Willoughby, Ohio. Dr. Westel Willoughby (1789–1844), the school's namesake and first president, oversaw the operation of the school until 1843, when a disagreement among the faculty led to their resignation from the school.

In 1847 the disgruntled faculty members started the Willoughby Medical College of Columbus in Columbus, Ohio, receiving a new charter from the Ohio Legislature on January 14, 1847. The inaugural student body consisted of 150 students, including dozens of medical students who had transferred from Willoughby University of Lake Erie. Almost immediately upon opening, the school was contacted by wealthy local business owner Lyne Starling, who offered $35,000 to construct a new hospital and school complex in Columbus. The concept of a hospital dedicated to teaching medical students was groundbreaking at the time.

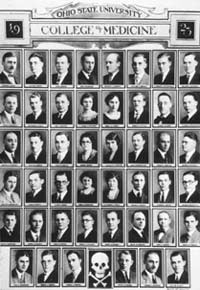
The Ohio State University College of Medicine Class of 1923

The construction of the Starling Medical College, named after its benefactor, was begun in 1848 but was not completed until 1887. Dr. Starling Loving was a trustee, professor, and dean at the Starling Medical College. Dr. Loving facilitated the arrival of the Sisters of the Poor of St. Francis to the area to run the hospital, which was named St. Francis Hospital in 1865.

In 1875, during elections for a new chairman of the board, James Fairchild Baldwin and several faculty members left the school and in 1876 founded another medical school, the Columbus Medical College. In 1882, the Columbus Medical College began construction on a new hospital, the Hawkes Hospital of Mt. Carmel, operated by the Sisters of the Holy Cross.

In 1892, members of the Columbus Medical College merged with Starling Medical College, angering Baldwin. In 1892, he and several faculty members resigned and started yet another medical school, the Ohio Medical University. The Ohio Medical University built Protestant Hospital, the forerunner of Riverside Methodist Hospitals, which still exists.

In 1907, the Ohio Medical University merged with Starling Medical College to form the Starling-Ohio Medical College.

The Ohio State College of Medicine was established in 1914 with William Means as the first dean. In the 1940s, the school had a two-year medical education program. In the 1970s, this was extended to three years, and then four years in the 1980s.

== Admissions ==
Admission to The Ohio State University College of Medicine is highly selective. For the class entering in 2021, OSU received 8,206 applications and interviewed 589 applicants for a class of 203 medical students. That matriculating class had an average GPA of 3.91 and an average MCAT score of 516.

== Facilities ==
The Ohio State University Wexner Medical Center has grown into a large complex with numerous specialty centers, hospitals, and research buildings. 44,000 patients are admitted into the OSU system every year. Another 635,000 are seen as outpatients (including outpatient surgery and 75,000 emergency patients).

The facilities include:

- Nationwide Children's Hospital
- The College of Medicine
- University Hospital
- Ohio State East Hospital
- James Cancer Hospital and Solove Research Institute
- Comprehensive Cancer Center
- Brain and Spine Hospital
- OSU Harding Hospital
- Dodd Hall Inpatient Rehabilitation Hospital
- The Richard M. Ross Heart Hospital
- Prior Hall
- Numerous ambulatory, primary care and sub-specialty clinics throughout Central Ohio

== Executive Leadership ==
Dr. Amy Moore is the interim Dean of the college and has been in the position since 2026.

- Jennifer Gold, MD, FAAP, Vice Dean for Education
- James Oñate, PhD, Interim Vice Dean for Health and Rehabilitation Sciences
- L. Arrick Forrest, MD, Vice Dean for Clinical Affairs
- Tatiana Oberyszyn, PhD, Vice Dean for Faculty Affairs
- Amanda Thatcher, Associate Vice President, Operations and Strategic Communications
- Bryan Pyles, Associate Vice President of Finance

== Notable research and developments ==
Pioneer Carl Leier developed dobutamine, the revolutionary drug treatment to help heart failure. Bertha Bouroncle discovered hairy cell leukemia in 1958 and developed a treatment for it, deoxycoformycin, nearly 30 years later along with Michael Grever and Erik Kraut. Kazi Mobin-Uddin who invented the first inferior vena cava filter was a faculty member. Albert de la Chappelle discovered a founder mutation in cancer. William Hunt and Robert Hess in the Department of Neurological Surgery developed the Hunt and Hess scale for grading the severity of intracranial hemorrhages.

Zollinger-Ellison syndrome was defined by two OSU faculty, Robert Zollinger and Edwin Ellison, in the 1940s. The first helicopter-based medical rescue was implemented at OSU in the 1960s.

Educational firsts by the Ohio State College of Medicine include an independent study curriculum in 1970, and a human cancer genetics fellowship. Ohio State was the first medical center in the United States to complete a heart bypass using minimally invasive robotics technology and the first to insert a digital pacemaker in a patient. Ohio State is a world leader in imaging research, installing the world's most powerful magnetic resonance imaging scanner in 1998, the 8 tesla MRI.

In 2000, Ohio State graduates Peter Kourlas and Matthew Strout conducted genetic research that led to the discovery of a gene that plays a role in acute myeloid leukemia. Their work was conducted in the lab of Michael A. Caligiuri, a researcher recognized for his work in leukemia, lymphoma and immunology.

In 2009, scientists at the university were the first to observe the real time behavior of the enzyme Dpo4, which aid studies understanding the molecular basis for cancer and other diseases. Later that year scientists developed technology that can magnetically manipulate cancerous cells.

In 2013, surgeon Christopher Kaeding performed the first surgery in the United States while streaming video live using Google Glass.

=== Robotic surgery ===
The Ohio State University Wexner Medical Center has had several firsts and breakthroughs in robotic surgery.

In 1999, Randall Wolf and Robert Michler became the first in the country to perform a robotically assisted heart bypass. While under the direction of Michler in 2009, the center became the first in North America to use the da Vinci HS SI robot during a surgery. In 2009, Ohio State was the first to demonstrate single incision robotic kidney surgery.

In 2010, Enver Ozer performed the first robotic thyroidectomy in central Ohio.

== Scientific misconduct ==
In 2017 and 2018, it was revealed that three faculty members separately involved in cancer research at OSU had falsified research findings. Carlo M. Croce, chair of the department of cancer biology and genetics, had 8 papers retracted and 15 more had corrections issued. Samson T. Jacob, a professor of cancer biology and genetics, has had five papers retracted after an investigation. Ching-Shih Chen, professor in medicinal chemistry and pharmacognosy, is under investigation for at least 21 incidents of scientific misconduct.

== National recognition ==
- Annually, OSUCOM earns recognition for having some of the best medical facilities in the United States, according to U.S. News & World Report magazine. In 2005, OSUCOM received recognition in 13 different areas and was called "One of America's Best Hospitals."
- U.S. News ranks Ohio State's Medical School among the top 50 research schools; it ranked the school 30th in the 2019 edition. In 2021, U.S. News ranked the school 33rd nationally.

== Notable alumni ==
- Jan Adams (born 1954), American cosmetic surgeon
- Quinn Capers IV, American cardiologist, member of OSU's Society of Master Clinicians, and former Chair of the Department of Medicine at Howard University
- Aaron Craft (born 1991), former Ohio State basketball player who also played professionally in the NBA G League and Europe; M.D. class of 2024
- David W. Deamer (born 1939), biologist
- John Frank (born 1962), professional NFL football player
- Cary Pigman (born 1958), Florida House Representative
- Frank Bradway Rogers (1914–1987), instrumental in changing the Army Medical Library into the National Library of Medicine
- Howard Tucker, recognized as the oldest practicing doctor by Guinness World Records
- John Wilce (1888–1963), Ohio State Buckeyes football coach from 1913 to 1928
