= Bertha Bouroncle =

Peruvian-American hematologist

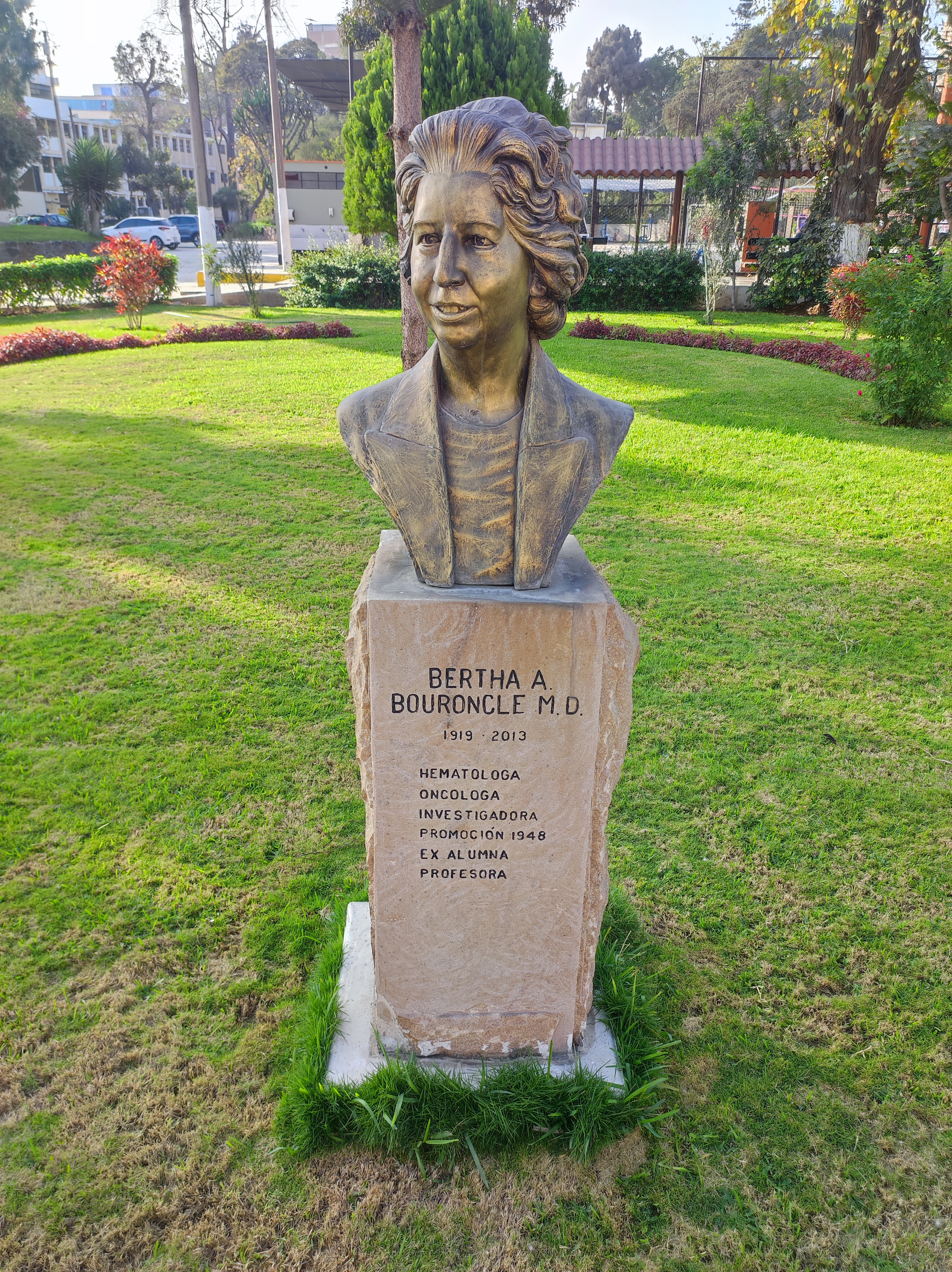
- Bust of Bertha Bouroncle located at the Faculty of Medicine, National University of San Marcos, Lima, Peru.
- Born: September 10, 1919; Trujillo, Peru
- Died: August 13, 2013 (aged 93); Columbus, Ohio
- Occupation: Physician
- Known for: Identifying hairy cell leukemia
- Medical career
- Field: Hematology
- Institutions: Ohio State University College of Medicine

Bertha A. Bouroncle Pereny (September 10, 1919 – August 13, 2013) was a Peruvian-American hematologist. After completing medical school in Peru, Bouroncle came to the United States for her postgraduate medical training. A longtime member of the faculty at the Ohio State University College of Medicine, she was the first investigator to identify hairy cell leukemia and the first female full professor in the state of Ohio.

In the 1980s, Bouroncle and two colleagues developed a drug to treat hairy cell leukemia. She was named a professor emerita at the medical school in 1989. Bouroncle died in 2013. She was predeceased by her husband Andrew Pereny, a businessman and erstwhile ceramic artist.

== Early life ==
Bouroncle was born in Trujillo, Peru. She was the fourth of five children in her family. Bouroncle, whose father Luis was a Harvard University alumnus, went to medical school at the National University of San Marcos. When she was not studying, Bouroncle gained experience by providing free medical care to fishermen in Pucusana. She also held a job as a laboratory research assistant, leading to an interest in hematology. The only female in her medical school graduating class in 1947, Bouroncle was the class valedictorian.

== Career ==
In 1948, Bouroncle left Peru to complete a postdoctoral fellowship at Ohio State. Between 1949 and 1953, she completed residency and fellowship training at the university in internal medicine and hematology. She spent the next year at Ohio State as a chief resident in medicine; she was the first female in Ohio to serve as a chief resident. Bouroncle was hired at Ohio State in the hematology-oncology division as an assistant professor in 1954. Bouroncle was named an associate professor in 1957.

Working with two junior colleagues the next year, Bouroncle identified a blood disorder known as hairy cell leukemia. She was named a full professor in 1970 and a professor emerita in 1989. She was the first female full professor of a medical school in Ohio. For many years, Bouroncle was on the medical staff of the Ohio State University Hospital. Among her colleagues, Bouroncle was noted for her commanding presence in spite of her small stature. Her associates said that she held trainees to very high standards without making them feel badly about themselves. She considered herself to be a shy person, but she found that she could open her heart to her patients.

Continuing her research with hairy cell leukemia, Bouroncle worked with Ohio State investigators Michael Grever and Eric Kraut in the 1980s to develop a treatment for the disease known as deoxycoformycin. She helped to found The James Cancer Hospital, which opened at Ohio State in 1990. She won several teaching-related awards at Ohio State.

== Personal life ==
In 1960, Bouroncle met businessman Andrew Pereny in Peru and they later married. Before he had become successful in business, Pereny produced a collection of ceramic art between 1933 and 1938. Several decades later, Pereny's work piqued the interest of art collectors because of his brief tenure as an artist. Pereny died in 1983.

Bouroncle funded the Bertha Bouroncle, MD, and Andrew Pereny Chair of Medicine at Ohio State. Outside of medicine, Bouroncle enjoyed the Columbus Symphony Orchestra.

== Later life ==
Ohio State established the Bertha Bouroncle Distinguished Lecture Award in 2001. Bouroncle donated $200,000 to the National University of San Marcos to build a new research laboratory. The school named the laboratory in her honor. She died at the Richard M. Ross Heart Hospital in 2013.
