= Ragavendra R. Baliga =

American cardiologist

Ragavendra R. Baliga is an American cardiologist who is Professor of Medicine at The Ohio State University School of Medicine in Columbus, Ohio. He is a consulting editor of Heart Failure Clinics of North America, an indexed medical journal along with James B. Young, MD, Executive Dean, Lerner College of Medicine, Cleveland Clinic, Cleveland, Ohio.

Using pioneering positron emission tomography techniques at the MRC Cyclotron Center at Hammersmith Hospital, London along with J.S. Kooner, Stuart Rosen and Paulo Camici, he demonstrated that angina occurring after a meal is due to "intramyocardial steal", wherein blood is redistributed from ischemic areas of the myocardium to the normally supplied myocardial in order to maintain overall myocardial blood flow. This mechanistic paper was published in the journal Circulation. Another paper published in the American Journal of Cardiology investigating the role of meal components showed that the carbohydrates contribute significantly to the pathogenesis of post-prandial angina.

While at Brigham and Women’s Hospital and Harvard Medical School he worked with Thomas Woodward Smith, Chief of Cardiovascular Medicine and Professor of Medicine, Harvard Medical School and Ralph A Kelly. At that time he worked as a part of a team to tease out the intracellular cell signaling pathways in response to a paracrine growth factor Neuregulin-1 in the cardiac myocyte. This research shed light on the effects of trastuzumab/Herceptin (a medication used in the treatment of breast cancer) on the heart and was published in the American Journal of Physiology and Journal of Biochemistry.

Baliga is best known for his book 250 Cases in Clinical Medicine, initially published by Balliere Tindall as 200 Cases in Clinical Medicine in June 1993, and later by W.B. Saunders, an imprint of Elsevier. He wrote this book at the age of 32. The book remains popular among medical students. His subsequent books include Self-assessment in Clinical Medicine, Saunders, although in its 3rd edition and 500 MCQs for the MRCP Part I, 1997 also by Saunders. A more recent book, Practical Cardiology, co-edited with Kim A Eagle, MD, and published by Lippincott Wilkins, is more popular.

== Early career ==
Baliga received an MBBS, from St. John's Medical College, Bangalore in 1984 and post-doctoral degree Doctor of Medicine, from Bangalore Medical College/Bangalore University in 1988. In 1988 along with Anura Kurpad he was founding editor of St. John’s Journal of Medicine which was subsequently edited by Ashley D’Cruz and Sunitha Simon Kurpad. After a hiatus this journal has been resurrected and now rechristened St. John’s Medical Journal.

He then migrated to the UK in 1988 and worked with Hans Frankel and Christopher J Mathias at the National Spinal Injuries Center affiliated with Stoke Mandeville Hospital, Aylesbury, Oxford Regional Health Authority and St. Mary’s Medical School, Paddington, London. The research he conducted shed light on the post-prandial cardiovascular hemodynamics in quadriplegics. Between 1990-1992 he worked at Clinical Tutor at University of Aberdeen, and Registrar with James Petrie, Peter Brunt, John Webster and Nigel Benjamin. From Scotland he moved the Hammersmith Hospital and Royal Postgraduate Medical School, London where he worked with J.Kooner and Paolo Camici at the MRC Cyclotron Center. He was involved with research pertaining to premature coronary artery disease in those hailing from the Indian sub-continent and he also investigated post-prandial hemodynamics.

He subsequently migrated to the US to work at Harvard Medical School and Brigham and Women’s Hospital where he was tutor on the New Pathway for Harvard medical students. He also worked with Andrew Selwyn, Professor of Harvard Medical School. His subsequent experience included working with Wilson S. Colucci, Professor of Medicine and Chief of Cardiology at Boston University Medical Center and with Clyde Yancy and Mark Drazner at UT Southwestern Medical Center.

== Notable research papers ==
- Mechanisms of Post-Prandial Angina Pectoris—Circulation, 1998;97:1144-49.
- Neuregulin Cell Signaling in Cardiac Myocyte—Am J Physiol. 1999 Nov;277(5 Pt 2):H2026-37
- Post-Prandial Hemodynamics in Quadriplegics—Clinical Autonomic Research, 1997;7:137-141.
- Carbohydrates are more likely to cause post-prandial angina—Am J Cardiol, 1997;79:1397-1400

== Books ==
- Baliga RR (ed). An Introductory Guide to Cardiac CT Imaging, Lippincott, Williams & Wilkins, 2010
- Baliga RR. Statin Prescribing Guide (Oxford American Pocket Notes), Oxford University Press, 2010
- Baliga, RR, Abraham WT (eds). Cardiac Resynchronization in Heart Failure, Lippincott, Williams & Wilkins, 2009
- Eagle KA, Baliga RR (Eds). Practical Cardiology: Evaluation and Treatment of Common Cardiovascular Disorders, Lippincott, Williams & Wilkins, 2008, pp 688, 2nd edition
- Raman J, Givertz M, Pitt B, Baliga RR (Eds). Management of Heart Failure, (Springer Verlag), 2008.
- Baliga RR, Neinber C, Isselbacher E, Eagle KA. Aortic Dissection and related syndromes. Springer, 2007
- Baliga RR. Crash Course (US): Internal Medicine, Mosby, 2006
- Baliga RR. Crash Course (US): Cardiology, Mosby, 2005 *
- Baliga RR. 250 Cases in Clinical Medicine, Elsevier, 3rd edition, 2002.
- Baliga RR. Self-assessment in Clinical Medicine, Saunders, 2003
- Baliga RR. MCQs in Clinical Medicine, Saunders, 1999
- Baliga RR. MCQs for the MRCP Part I, W.B. Saunders, 1997

== Metaphrastic works ==
Statin Prescribing Guide has been translated into Polish. Management of Heart Failure translated to Italian

== Editorials ==
- Baliga RR, Young JB. Editorial: Sudden death in heart failure: an ounce of prediction is worth a pound of prevention. Heart Fail Clin. 2011 Apr;7(2):xiii-xviii. PMID 21439492.
- Baliga RR, Young JB. Editorial: depression in heart failure is double trouble: warding off the blues requires early screening. Heart Fail Clin. 2011 Jan;7(1):xiii-xvii. PMID 21109201.
- Baliga RR, Young JB. Editorial: Giant strides and baby steps in pediatric cardiac disease and heart failure in children. Heart Fail Clin. 2010 Oct;6(4):xiii-v. PMID 20869640.
- Baliga RR, Young JB. Staying in the pink of health for patients with cardiorenal anemia requires a multidisciplinary approach. Heart Fail Clin. 2010 Jul;6(3):xi-xvi. PMID 20630399.
- Baliga RR, Young JB. Editorial. Unleashing our healthy avatars using cardiovascular genetics. Heart Fail Clin. 2010 Apr;6(2):xi-xiii. PMID 20347781.
- Baliga RR, Young JB. Pharmacogenomics transforming medicine to create a world of immortal Struldbruggs or even a Methuselah? So be it! Heart Fail Clin. 2010 Jan;6(1):xi-xiii. PMID 19945053.
- Baliga RR, Narula J. Salt never calls itself sweet. Indian J Med Res. 2009 May;129(5):472-7. PMID 19675372.
- Baliga RR, Young JB. Editorial: Do biomarkers deserve high marks? Heart Fail Clin. 2009 Oct;5(4):ix-xii. PMID 19631170.
- Baliga RR, Young JB. Using a magnet to strike gold. Heart Fail Clin. 2009 Jul;5(3):ix-x. PMID 19564007.
- Baliga RR, Young JB. Editorial: Bench to bedside to home: homing-in on therapy that begins at home. Heart Fail Clin. 2009 Apr;5(2):xiii-xiv. PMID 19249682.
- Baliga RR, Young JB. The race to tissue oxygenation: special teams GoGoGo. Heart Fail Clin. 2009 Jan;5(1):xi-xiv. PMID 19026378.
- Baliga RR, Young JB. "Stiff central arteries" syndrome: does a weak heart really stiff the kidney? Heart Fail Clin. 2008 Oct;4(4):ix-xii. PMID 18760749.
- Baliga RR, Young JB. Editorial: the concertina pump. Heart Fail Clin. 2008 Jul;4(3):xiii-xix. PMID 18598975.
- Baliga RR, Young JB. Statins or status quo? Heart Fail Clin. 2008 Apr;4(2):ix-xii. PMID 18433691.
- Baliga RR, Young JB. Energizing diastole. Heart Fail Clin. 2008 Jan;4(1):ix-xiii. Review. PMID 18313619.
- Baliga RR, Young JB. Never too late to drink from the fountain of youth. Heart Fail Clin. 2007 Oct;3(4):xi-xii. PMID 17905373.

== Education ==
Date	Degree	Institution
2011	Certification Cardiovascular Medicine	American Board of Internal Medicine
2010	Certification Internal Medicine	American Board of Internal Medicine
2004	MBA	Stephen M Ross School of Business, University of Michigan
1998-1999	Fellowship in Cardiac Transplantation	UT Southwestern Medical Center, Dallas, Tx
1997-1998	Advanced Fellowship in Heart Failure	Boston University Medical Center, Boston, MA
1995-1997	Clinical & Research Fellow in Cardiology	Harvard Medical School/Brigham & Women's Hospital, Boston, MA
1992-1995	Cardiology Fellowship/Registrar	Hammersmith Hospital/Royal Postgraduate Medical School, London, UK
1993	FLEX	National Board of Medical Examiners and Federation Licensing Examination, US
1991	MRCP (UK)	Royal College of Physicians, UK
1990-1992	Registrar and Clinical Tutor	Aberdeen Royal Infirmary/University of Aberdeen, Aberdeen, Scotland
1989-1990	Clinical and Research Fellow in Cardiovascular Medicine	St. Mary’s Medical School, Paddington, London
1988-1989	SHO	National Spinal Injuries Center, Stoke Mandeville, Oxford Regional Health Authority
1988	PLAB	GMC, UK
1988	Post doctoral degree in Internal Medicine, (MD) General Medicine	Bangalore University
1988	Diplomate of National Board in General Internal Medicine	National Board of Medical Examinations, New Delhi
1985-1987	Resident/PostGraduate in General Internal Medicine	Victoria and Bowring Hospitals, Bangalore Medical College
1983-1984	Rotating Internship/MBBS	St. John's Medical College, Bangalore

== Appointments and affiliations ==
Dates	Title	Organization	City, State/Province
2008-to date-	Professor of Internal Medicine and Vice Chair in Cardiovascular Medicine	The Ohio State University Medical Center & The Richard M. Ross Heart Hospital	Columbus, Ohio
2005–2008	Chief and Director of Cardiovascular Medicine	University of Hospitals East	Columbus, Ohio
2005 – present	Attending Cardiologist	The Ohio State University Medical Center	Columbus, Ohio
1999–2005	Asst Professor of Internal Medicine and Attending Cardiologist	University of Michigan Medical School Hospital	Ann Arbor, MI
2000–2004	Co-Director, M2 Cardiovascular Sequence	University of Michigan Medical School Hospital	Ann Arbor, MI
1996	Clinical Tutor, New Pathway	Harvard Medical School	Boston, MA
1990-1992	Clinical Tutor, General Internal Internal Medicine	University of Aberdeen Medical School	Aberdeen, Scotland

== Honors and awards ==
Honoris Causa

- Fellow of Royal College of Physicians, Edinburgh, 2002
- Fellow of American College of Cardiology, 2002
- Fellow, Royal Society of Medicine, London, 2007
- Representative and Visiting Professor of American College of Cardiology (ACC), 3rd Annual Best of ACC, Cardiovascular Medicine, Best Practices Series, India, 2009, Hyderabad, New Delhi and Lucknow, Aug 1-7, 2009,
- J.P. Das Oration, Indian College of Cardiology, 2010, Prof C.N. Manjunath, MD, DM, Dr U.C. Samal, Prof T.R. Raghu, MD, DM
- Fellow of American College of Physicians, 2011
- Visiting Professor University of Naples Federico II, 2011, Facolta di Medicina e Chirugia, 17 giugno 2011, Aula grande edificio 2, introducono: Prof. Eduardo Bossone (AOU Salerno), Prof. Antonio Cittadini (Universita "Fedrico II" di Napoli)
