= Hairy cell leukemia =

Hematological malignancy

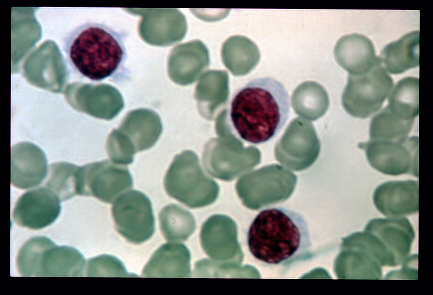
- Specialty: Hematology and oncology

Hairy cell leukemia is an uncommon hematological malignancy characterized by an accumulation of abnormal B lymphocytes. The incidence of hairy cell leukemia (HCL) is 0.28-0.30 cases per 100,000 people in Europe and the United States. The prevalence is approximately 3.12 cases per 100,000 in Europe, with a lower prevalence in Asia, Africa, and the Middle East.

HCL has an indolent course, but patients frequently relapse. Despite this, with treatment, life expectancy is usually the same as that for the general population.

HCL was originally described as histiocytic leukemia, malignant reticulosis, or lymphoid myelofibrosis in publications dating back to the 1920s. The disease was formally named leukemic reticuloendotheliosis, and its characterization was significantly advanced by Bertha Bouroncle and colleagues at the Ohio State University College of Medicine in 1958. Its common name, which was coined in 1966, is derived from the "hairy" appearance of the cytoplasmic projections from malignant B cells under a microscope.

== Signs and symptoms ==
In HCL, the "hairy cells" (malignant B lymphocytes) accumulate in the bone marrow, interfering with the production of normal white blood cells, red blood cells, and platelets. Consequently, patients may develop infections related to low white blood cell count, anemia and fatigue due to a lack of red blood cells, or easy bleeding due to a low platelet count.

Platelet function may be somewhat impaired in HCL patients, although this does not appear to have any significant practical effect.

Patients with a high tumor burden may also have somewhat reduced levels of cholesterol, especially in patients with an enlarged spleen.

Those with HCL rarely have constitutional symptoms such as fevers, chills, weight loss or rigors. 20-30% may have opportunistic infections due to an impairment in immune function. Rarely, in recurrent disease, bone lesions may be present which can be confused for other malignancies such as multiple myeloma.

== Cause ==
As with many cancers, the cause of HCL is unknown. Exposure to tobacco smoke, ionizing radiation, or industrial chemicals (with the possible exception of diesel) does not appear to increase the risk of developing it. Farming and gardening correlate with an increased risk of HCL development in some studies which does not necessarily imply causation.

A 2011 study identified somatic BRAF V600E mutations in all 47 HCL patients studied, and no such mutations in the 193 peripheral B-cell lymphomas/leukemias other than HCL.

The U.S. Institute of Medicine (IOM) found a correlation that permits an association between exposure to herbicides and later development of chronic B-cell leukemias and lymphomas in general. The IOM report emphasizes that neither animal nor human studies indicate an association of herbicides with HCL specifically. However, the IOM extrapolated data from chronic lymphocytic leukemia and non-Hodgkin lymphoma to conclude that HCL and other rare B-cell neoplasms may share this risk factor.

Human T-lymphotropic virus 2 (HTLV-2) has been isolated in a small number of patients with the variant form of HCL. In the 1980s, HTLV-2 was identified in a patient with a T-cell lymphoproliferative disease; this patient later developed HCL, but HTLV-2 was not found in the hairy cell clones. There is no evidence that HTLV-II causes any sort of hematological malignancy, including HCL.

In a small population-based study, the incidence of HCL was higher in those who used or handled pesticides.

== Pathophysiology ==
Pancytopenia in HCL is caused primarily by bone marrow failure and enlargement of the spleen. Bone-marrow failure is caused by the accumulation of hairy cells and reticulin fibrosis in the bone marrow, as well as by the detrimental effects of dysregulated cytokine production. Splenomegaly reduces blood counts through sequestration, marginalization, and destruction of healthy blood cells inside the spleen.

Hairy cells are nearly mature B cells, which are activated clonal cells with signs of VH gene differentiation. They may be related to pre-plasma marginal zone B cells or memory B cells.

Cytokine production is disturbed in HCL. Hairy cells produce and thrive on TNF-alpha. This cytokine also suppresses normal production of healthy blood cells in the bone marrow.

Unlike healthy B cells, hairy cells express and secrete an immune system protein called interleukin-2 receptor (IL-2R). In HCL-V, only part of this receptor is expressed. As a result, disease status can be monitored by measuring changes in the amount of IL-2R in the blood serum.

Hairy cells respond to normal production of some cytokines by T cells with increased growth. Treatment with interferon-alpha suppresses the production of this pro-growth cytokine from T cells. A low level of T cells, which is commonly seen after treatment with cladribine or pentostatin, and the consequent reduction of these cytokines, is also associated with reduced levels of hairy cells.

Nearly all cases of HCL have the BRAF mutation V600E, and it is proposed that this is the disease's driver mutation. Until this point, only a few genomic imbalances had been found in the hairy cells, such as trisomy 5 had been found. The expression of genes is also dysregulated in a complex and specific pattern. The cells underexpress 3p24, 3p21, 3q13.3-q22, 4p16, 11q23, 14q22-q24, 15q21-q22, 15q24-q25, and 17q22-q24 and overexpress 13q31 and Xq13.3-q21. It has not yet been demonstrated that any of these changes have any practical significance to the patient.

== Diagnosis ==
The diagnosis of HCL may be suggested by abnormal results on a complete blood count (CBC), but additional testing is necessary to confirm the diagnosis. A CBC normally shows low counts for white blood cells, red blood cells, and platelets in HCL patients. However, if large numbers of hairy cells are in the bloodstream, then normal or even high lymphocyte counts may be found.

On physical examination, 80–90% of patients have an enlarged spleen, which can be massive. This is less likely among patients who are diagnosed at an early stage. Peripheral lymphadenopathy (enlarged lymph nodes) is uncommon (less than 5% of patients), but abdominal lymphadenopathy is a relatively common finding on computed tomography scans.

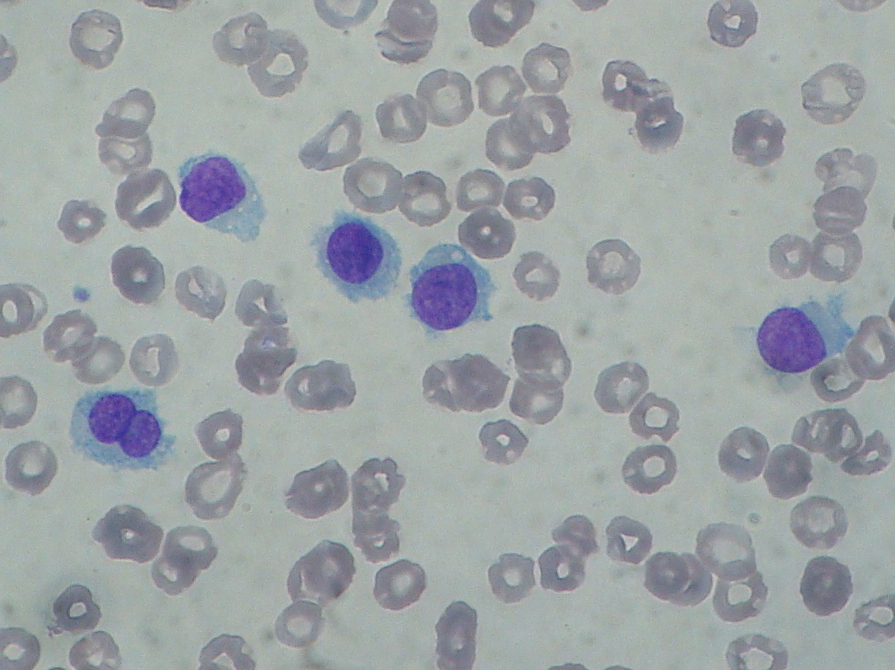
Hairy cell leukemia: Abnormal B cells look "hairy" under a microscope because of radial projections from their surface.

The most important laboratory finding is the presence of hairy cells in the bloodstream. Hairy cells are abnormal white blood cells with hair-like projections of cytoplasm; they can be seen by examining a blood smear or bone marrow biopsy specimen. The blood film examination is done by staining the blood cells with Wright's stain and looking at them under a microscope. Hairy cells are visible in this test in about 85% of cases. Along with the characteristic surface projections, hairy cells also have large amounts of cytoplasm, an oval (sometimes cleaved) nucleus with homogenous chromatin and without distinct nucleoli, giving the cells a "fried egg" appearance.

Most patients require a bone marrow biopsy for final diagnosis. The bone marrow biopsy is used both to confirm the presence of HCL and to exclude other diseases, such as Splenic marginal zone lymphoma or B-cell prolymphocytic leukemia. The bone marrow in HCL may show a diffuse infiltration of leukemic cells or an interstitial infiltration with partial preservation of fat and hematopoietic stem cells. The diagnosis can be confirmed by viewing the cells with a special stain known as tartrate resistant acid phosphatase (TRAP). More recently, DB44 testing assures more accurate results.

Definitely diagnosing HCL is also possible through flow cytometry on blood or bone marrow. The hairy cells are larger than normal and positive for CD19, CD20, CD22, CD11c, CD25, CD103, and FMC7 antigens. (CD103, CD22, and CD11c are strongly expressed.)

Annexin A1 and the BRAF v600E mutant protein are the most sensitive and specific cell markers associated with HCL. Diseases mimicking HCL are usually negative for both markers.

Hairy cell leukemia-variant (HCL-V), which shares some characteristics with B cell prolymphocytic leukemia (B-PLL), does not show CD25 (also called the interleukin-2 receptor, alpha).

The differential diagnoses include several kinds of anemia, including myelophthisis and aplastic anemia, and most kinds of blood neoplasms, including hypoplastic myelodysplastic syndrome, atypical chronic lymphocytic leukemia, B-cell prolymphocytic leukemia, or idiopathic myelofibrosis.

=== Classification ===
The "classic" form is often implied, but hairy cell leukemia-variant has also been described.

==== HCL-V ====
Hairy cell leukemia-variant (HCL-V) is usually described as a prolymphocytic variant of HCL. It was first described in 1980. About 10% of people with HCL have this variant form of the disease, representing about 60-75 new cases of HCL-V each year in the U.S. While classic HCL primarily affects men, HCL-V is more evenly divided between males and females. While the disease can appear at any age, the median age at diagnosis is over 70.

Similar to B-cell prolymphocytic leukemia (B-PLL) in chronic lymphocytic leukemia, HCL-V is a more aggressive disease. Historically, it has been considered less likely to be treated successfully than is classic HCL, and remissions have tended to be shorter. The introduction of combination therapy with concurrent rituximab and cladribine therapy, though, has shown excellent results in early follow-up. As of 2016, this therapy is considered the first-line treatment of choice for many people with HCL-V.

Many older treatment approaches, such as interferon-alpha, the combination chemotherapy regimen "CHOP", and common alkylating agents such as cyclophosphamide, showed very little benefit. Pentostatin and cladribine administered as monotherapy (without concurrent rituximab) provide some benefit to many people with HCL-V, but typically induce shorter remission periods and lower response rates than when they are used in classic HCL. More than half of the people respond partially to splenectomy.

HCL-V differs from classic HCL principally in these respects:

- Higher white blood cell counts, sometimes exceeding 100,000 cells per microliter
- A more aggressive course of disease requiring more frequent treatment
- Hairy cells with an unusually large nucleolus for their size
- Production of little excess fibronectin produced by classic hairy cells to interfere with bone marrow biopsies
- Low or no cell-surface expression of CD25 (interleukin-2 [IL-2] receptor alpha chain, or p55).

Low levels of CD25, a part of the receptor for a key immunoregulating hormone, may explain why HCL-V cases are generally much more resistant to treatment by immune-system hormones.

HCL-V, which usually features a high proportion of hairy cells without a functional p53 tumor suppressor gene, is somewhat more likely to transform into a higher-grade malignancy. A typical transformation rate of 5-6% has been postulated in the UK, similar to the Richter's transformation rate for splenic lymphoma with villous lymphocytes (SLVL) and CLL. Among HCL-V patients, the most aggressive cases normally have the least amount of p53 gene activity. Hairy cells without the p53 gene tend, over time, to displace the less aggressive p53(+) hairy cells.

Some evidence suggests that a rearrangement of the immunoglobulin gene VH4-34, which is found in about 40% of HCL-V patients and 10% of classic HCL patients, may be a more important poor prognostic factor than variant status, with HCL-V patients without the VH4-34 rearrangement responding about as well as classic HCL patients.

== Treatment ==
Several treatments are available, and successful control of the disease is common.

- Not everyone requires treatment immediately. Due to the indolent nature of HCL, a "watchful waiting" approach may be done for those without significant cytopenia (low hemoglobin, absolute neutrophil count, and platelet count), symptomatic organomegaly, recurrent infections, or constitutional symptoms. This watchful waiting approach is used in about 10-20% of people.

=== First-line therapy ===
Purine analogs such as cladribine and pentostatin are the first-line therapies for HCL. Purine analogs are very effective in the treatment of HCL, achieving remission rates of 80-90%; with remission being defined as normal or near normal blood counts, no palpable splenomegaly, and no hairy cells on bone marrow biopsy or peripheral blood without immunostaining, or minimal hairy cells with immunostaining (known as measurable residual disease). The benefits of treating measurable residual disease are not well established. The median relapse-free time for purine analogs is greater than 10 years. The possible side effects of purine analogs include rash, fever, neutropenia, infections, and low T-cell counts (especially CD4+ T-cells). Purine analogs may cause immunosuppression over time and should not be used if the patients have an active infection.

Rituximab, the anti-CD20 monoclonal antibody, may be added to purine analogs during initial treatment and is associated with increasing the remission rate to nearly 100%. Purine analogs may be restarted in those with relapsed disease, with or without rituximab.

Cladribine can be administered by injection under the skin, by infusion over a few hours into a vein (intravenous - IV), or by a pump worn by the patient that provides a slow drip into a vein throughout the day. Most patients receive cladribine by IV infusion once a day for five to seven days, but more patients are being given the option of taking this drug once a week for six weeks. The different dosing schedules used with cladribine are roughly equally effective and safe. Relatively few patients have significant side effects other than fatigue and a high fever caused by the cancer cells dying, although complications such as infection and acute kidney failure have been seen. Pentostatin is chemically similar to cladribine, and has a similar success rate and side effect profile, but it is always given over a much longer period of time, usually one dose by IV infusion every two weeks for 3–6 months.

During the weeks following treatment, patients' immune systems are severely weakened, but their bone marrow will begin to produce normal blood cells again. Treatment often results in long-term remission. If the cancer cells return, the treatment may be repeated and should again result in remission, although the treatment response may decline with repeated treatment.

Cladribine induced complete responses in patients with hairy cell leukemia resistant to pentostatin, suggesting a lack of cross-resistance..

=== Second-line therapy ===
If a patient is resistant to either cladribine or pentostatin, or in those with relapsed disease, then second-line therapy is pursued.

- BRAF inhibitors such as vemurafenib or dabrafenib inhibit the MAPK/ERK pathway, which is constitutively active in those with a BRAF V600E kinase activating mutation (which is 95% of those with HCL). Constitutively active MAPK kinase activity is what leads to disease activity in HCL by increasing cell survival, increasing proliferation, and reducing apoptosis of the leukemic cells. BRAF inhibitors have an overall response rate of greater than 90% with a complete response of 30-35% in people with relapsed or refractory HCL. They are also known to have less toxic effects than the purine analogs. They may be combined with rituximab to increase the remission rate. The median duration of response with BRAF inhibitors is 1.5 years (more than 3 years if combined with rituximab), after which remission occurs. BRAF inhibitors with or without rituximab may be restarted if there is relapsed disease.
- Ritixumab: Two partial and 10 complete responses resulted from 15 patients with relapsed disease, for a total of 80% responding. The median response time is greater than 3 years. Rituximab has successfully induced a complete response in Hairy Cell-Variant.

Rituximab may cause a serum sickness reaction which presents with fevers, joint pain and rash approximately 4-10 days after any infusion. The reaction is successfully treated with steroids.

- If progression of disease or relapse is seen in those previously on BRAF inhibitors plus rituximab, the combination can be retried. Or the anti-CD22 immunotoxin moxetumomab pasudotox can be tried. Or a BRAF inhibitor can be restarted plus MEK inhibitors trametinib or cobimetinib.
- Interferon-alpha is an immune system hormone that is very helpful to a relatively small number of patients, and somewhat helpful to most patients. In about 65% of patients, the drug helps stabilize the disease or produce a slow, minor improvement for a partial response. Some patients can achieve the negativization of minimal residual disease by BRAF-V600E status

Some patients tolerate IFN-alpha very well after the first few weeks, while others find that its characteristic flu-like symptoms persist. About 10% of patients develop a level of depression.

A drop in blood counts is usually seen during the first 1–2 months of treatment. Most patients find that their blood counts get worse for a few weeks immediately after starting treatment, although some patients find their blood counts begin to improve within just 2 weeks.

Typically, 6 months are needed to figure out whether this therapy is useful. Common criteria for treatment success include:

- Normalization of hemoglobin levels (above 12.0 g/dL),
- A normal or somewhat low platelet count (above 100 K/μL), and
- A normal or somewhat low absolute neutrophil count (above 1.5 K/μL).

IFN-alpha is considered the drug of choice for pregnant women with active HCL.

IFN-alpha works by sensitizing the hairy cells to the killing effect of the immune-system hormone TNF-alpha, whose production it promotes. IFN-alpha works best on classic hairy cells that are not protectively adhered to vitronectin or fibronectin, which suggests that patients who encounter less fibrous tissue in their bone-marrow biopsies may be more likely to respond to IFN-alpha therapy. It also explains why unadhered hairy cells, such as those in the bloodstream, disappear during IFN-alpha treatment well before reductions are seen in adhered hairy cells, such as those in the bone marrow and spleen.

=== Other treatments ===
Splenectomy (once commonly used in the treatment of HCL) has been replaced by purine analogs and other first-line therapies, which are associated with greater response rates and longer responses. But splenectomy may still be done when other therapies fail, and there is a large disease burden (clonal B cells) in the spleen.

People with low numbers of red blood cells or platelets may also receive red blood cells and platelets through blood transfusions. Affected people may also receive a hormone to stimulate the production of red blood cells.

People with low neutrophil counts may be given filgrastim or a similar hormone to stimulate production of white blood cells. However, a 1999 study indicates that routine administration of this expensive injected drug has no practical value for HCL patients after cladribine administration. In this study, patients who received filgrastim were just as likely to experience a high fever and to be admitted to the hospital as those who did not, even though the drug elevated their white blood cell counts.

Hematopoietic stem cell transplantation for HCL does not improve relapse-free survival at 5 years and is associated with a high mortality rate above 15%, and is not recommended.

== Prognosis ==
=== Treatment success ===
More than 95% of new patients are treated well or at least adequately by cladribine or pentostatin. A majority of new patients can expect a disease-free remission time span of about ten years, or sometimes much longer after taking one of these drugs just once. If retreatment is necessary in the future, the drugs are normally effective again, although the average length of remission is somewhat shorter in subsequent treatments. There is also the risk of shingles and peripheral neuropathy after treatment with cladribine.

As with B-cell chronic lymphocytic leukemia, mutations in the IGHV on hairy cells are associated with better responses to initial treatments and with prolonged survival.

How soon after treatment a patient feels "normal" again depends on several factors, including:

- how advanced the disease was at the time of treatment;
- the patient's underlying health status;
- whether the patient had a "complete response" or only a partial response to the treatment;
- whether the patient experienced any of the rare, but serious side effects, such as kidney failure;
- how aggressive the individual's disease is;
- whether the patient is experiencing unusual psychological trauma from the "cancer" diagnosis; and
- how the patient perceived his or her pre-treatment energy level and daily functioning.

=== Lifespan ===
With appropriate treatment, the overall projected lifespan for patients is normal or near-normal. In all patients, the first two years after diagnosis have the highest risk for fatal outcome; generally, surviving five years predicts good control of the disease. After five years' clinical remission, patients in the United States with normal blood counts can often qualify for private life insurance with some US companies.

Accurately measuring survival for patients with the variant form of the disease (HCL-V) is complicated by the relatively high median age (70 years old) at diagnosis. However, HCL-V patients routinely survive for more than 10 years, and younger patients can likely expect a long life.

=== Follow-up care ===
Despite decade-long remissions and years of living very normal lives after treatment, hairy cell leukemia is officially considered an incurable disease. While survivors of solid tumors are commonly declared to be permanently cured after two, three, or five years, people who have hairy cell leukemia are never considered 'cured'. Relapses of HCL have happened even after more than twenty years of continuous remission. Patients will require lifelong monitoring and should be aware that the disease can recur even after decades of good health.

While most oncologists consider Hairy Cell Leukemia to be incurable, there is some evidence that some patients are, in fact, cured after treatments. Of the original 358-patient cohort treated with cladribine at the Scripps Clinic, 9 of 19 in continuous CR for a median of 16 years were free of HCL, even sensitive testing for measurable or minimal residual disease (MRD) found an absence of hairy cells. This suggests that the disease of at least some patients may be cured.

People in remission need regular follow-up examinations after their treatment is over. Most physicians insist on seeing patients at least once a year for the rest of the patient's life, and getting blood counts about twice a year. Regular follow-up care ensures that patients are carefully monitored, any changes in health are discussed, and new or recurrent cancer can be detected and treated as soon as possible. Between regularly scheduled appointments, people who have hairy cell leukemia should report any health problems, especially viral or bacterial infections, as soon as they appear.

HCL patients have approximately the same risk of developing a second kind of cancer, such as colon cancer or lung cancer as the general population.

There is also a higher risk of developing an autoimmune disease. Polyarteritis nodosa has been associated with underlying hairy cell leukemia in certain cases. Autoimmune diseases may also go into remission after treatment of HCL.

== Epidemiology ==
HCL is more common in men, with the male-to-female ratio being 4 to 1, and the median age at diagnosis is 55-60. It does not occur in children. The incidence in the United States and Europe is 0.28-0.3 cases per 100,000, and the prevalence is 3 cases per 100,000people in Europe. It is less common in Africa, the Middle East, and Asia.

It does not appear to be hereditary, although rare familial cases that suggest a predisposition have been reported, usually showing a common Human Leukocyte Antigen (HLA) type.

== Research directions ==
The Hairy Cell Leukemia Consortium was founded in 2008 to address researchers' concerns about the long-term future of research on the disease.

In 2013, the Hairy Cell Leukemia Foundation was created when the Hairy Cell Leukemia Consortium and the Hairy Cell Leukemia Research Foundation joined. The HCLF is dedicated to improving outcomes for patients and advancing research into HCL.

Three immunotoxin drugs have been studied in patients at the NIH National Cancer Institute in the U.S.: BL22, HA22 and LMB-2. All of these protein-based drugs combine part of an anti-B cell antibody with a bacterial toxin to kill the cells on internalization. BL22 and HA22 attack a common protein called CD22, which is present on hairy cells and healthy B cells. LMB-2 attacks a protein called CD25, which is not present in HCL-variant, so LMB-2 is only useful for patients with classic HCL. HA-22, now renamed moxetumomab pasudotox, is being studied in patients with relapsed hairy cell leukemia.

Other clinical trials are studying the effectiveness of cladribine followed by rituximab in eliminating residual hairy cells that remain after treatment by cladribine or pentostatin. It is not currently known if the elimination of such residual cells will result in more durable remissions.

The major remaining research questions are identifying the cause of HCL and determining what prevents hairy cells from maturing normally.
