= George A. Calin =

Romanian-American molecular pathologist

- Born: Romania

Academic background
- Education: MD, 1992, PhD, 2000, Carol Davila University of Medicine and Pharmacy
- Thesis: Particularitatile clinico-biologice ale tumorilor gastrointestinale cu instabilitate a microsatelitilor (2000)

George Adrian Călin is a Romanian-American molecular pathologist. He is a Professor in the Department of Translational Molecular Pathology at MD Anderson Cancer Center.

== Early life and education ==
Calin was born and raised in the communist state of the Socialist Republic of Romania. He earned his medical degree and PhD at the Carol Davila University of Medicine and Pharmacy in Romania and began a private practice as a gastroenterologist. During this time, he also worked with the Romanian police in the molecular genetics laboratory for the National Forensic Institute. Calin studied cancer genomics at the University of Ferrara under Massimo Negrini from 1997 to 1999 before accepting a post-doctoral fellowship at the Sidney Kimmel Cancer Center, working in the laboratory of Carlo M. Croce.

== Career ==
Calin followed Croce to Ohio State University, where they made landmark discoveries in the field of genetics. In 2002, Calin and Croce identified that certain microRNAs were deleted or downregulated in chronic lymphocytic leukemia (CLL). This was the first demonstration that microRNAs could play a direct role in human cancer. Calin eventually left Croce's laboratory in 2007 to join the faculty at the MD Anderson Cancer Center. During his early tenure at the institution, he was named co-director of the Center for RNA Interference and Non-Coding RNAs and became an associate professor of Leukemia. In 2016, Calin was elected a Member of the American Society for Clinical Investigation. In 2020, he was elected a Fellow of the American Association for the Advancement of Science for "his landmark discovery linking human diseases and miRNAs, specifically downregulation of miRNAs in patients with leukemias" and for pioneering "the concept of microRNAs involvement in neurogenesis."
