= Integrin alpha X =

Mammalian protein found in Homo sapiens

ITGAX
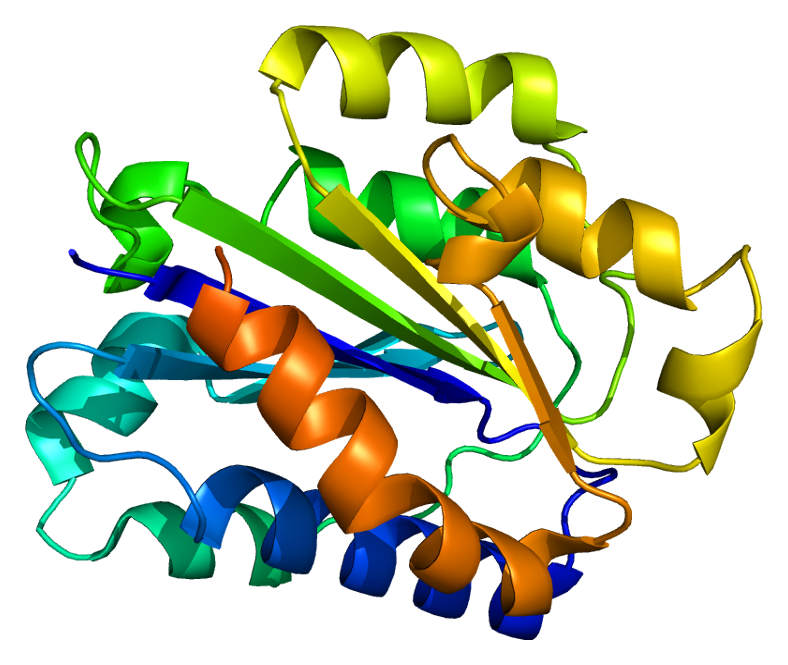

Identifiers
- Aliases: ITGAX, CD11C, SLEB6, integrin subunit alpha X
- External IDs: OMIM: 151510; MGI: 96609; GeneCards: ITGAX
Available structures
PDB	Ortholog search: PDBe RCSB
PDB	List of PDB id codes 1N3Y, 2LUV, 3K6S, 3K71, 3K72, 4NEH, 4NEN, 5ES4

Gene location (Human)
Chr.	Chromosome 16 (human)
Band	16p11.2	Start	31,355,134 bp
Band	16p11.2	End	31,382,999 bp

Gene location (Mouse)
Chr.	Chromosome 7 (mouse)
Band	7|7 F3	Start	127,728,719 bp
Band	7|7 F3	End	127,749,829 bp
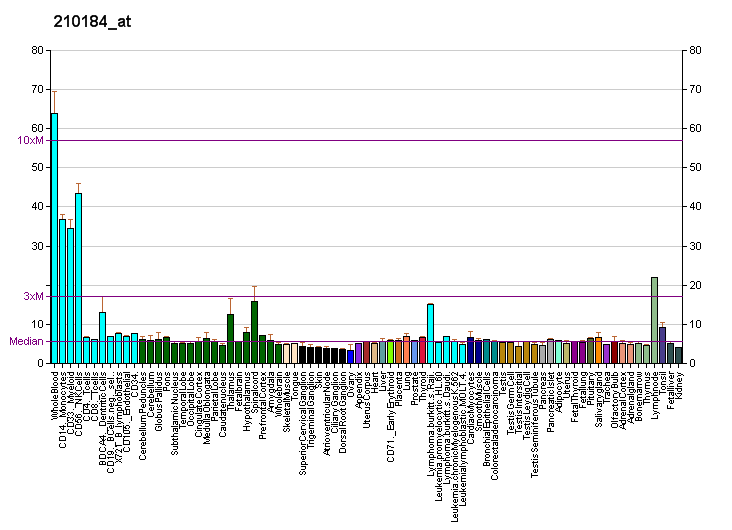
RNA expression pattern
Bgee	Human / Mouse (ortholog); Top expressed in: granulocyte; monocyte; blood; upper lobe of left lung; spleen; right lung; appendix; C1 segment; gallbladder; bone marrow cell / Top expressed in: spleen; right lung lobe; granulocyte; mesenteric lymph nodes; blastocyst; blood; lactiferous gland; jejunum; thymus; subcutaneous adipose tissue; More reference expression data
BioGPS	More reference expression data
Gene ontology
Molecular function	protein binding; metal ion binding; signaling receptor activity
Cellular component	integral component of membrane; cell surface; integrin complex; plasma membrane; membrane; secretory granule membrane; tertiary granule membrane; ficolin-1-rich granule membrane
Biological process	animal organ morphogenesis; integrin-mediated signaling pathway; heterotypic cell-cell adhesion; cell adhesion; extracellular matrix organization; leukocyte migration; positive regulation of protein targeting to mitochondrion; neutrophil degranulation; cytokine-mediated signaling pathway
Sources:Amigo / QuickGO
Orthologs
Databases	NCBI: entry; OMA: entry
Species	Human	Mouse
Entrez	3687	16411
Ensembl	ENSG00000140678	ENSMUSG00000030789
UniProt	P20702	Q9QXH4
RefSeq (mRNA)	NM_000887; NM_001286375	NM_021334; NM_001363984; NM_001363985
RefSeq (protein)	NP_000878; NP_001273304	NP_067309; NP_001350913; NP_001350914
Location (UCSC)	Chr 16: 31.36 – 31.38 Mb	Chr 7: 127.73 – 127.75 Mb
PubMed search
- Wikidata
View/Edit Human	View/Edit Mouse

CD11c, also known as Integrin, alpha X (complement component 3 receptor 4 subunit) (ITGAX), is a gene that encodes for CD11c .

CD11c is an integrin alpha X chain protein. Integrins are heterodimeric integral membrane proteins composed of an alpha chain and a beta chain. This protein combines with the beta 2 chain (ITGB2) to form a leukocyte-specific integrin referred to as inactivated-C3b (iC3b) receptor 4 (CR4). The alpha X beta 2 complex seems to overlap the properties of the alpha M beta 2 integrin in the adherence of neutrophils and monocytes to stimulated endothelium cells, and in the phagocytosis of complement coated particles.

CD11c is a type I transmembrane protein found at high levels on most human dendritic cells, but also on monocytes, macrophages, neutrophils, and some B cells that induces cellular activation and helps trigger neutrophil respiratory burst; expressed in hairy cell leukemias, acute nonlymphocytic leukemias, and some B-cell chronic lymphocytic leukemias.

== See also ==
- Integrin
