= Quinn Capers IV =

American cardiologist

Dr. Quinn Capers IV
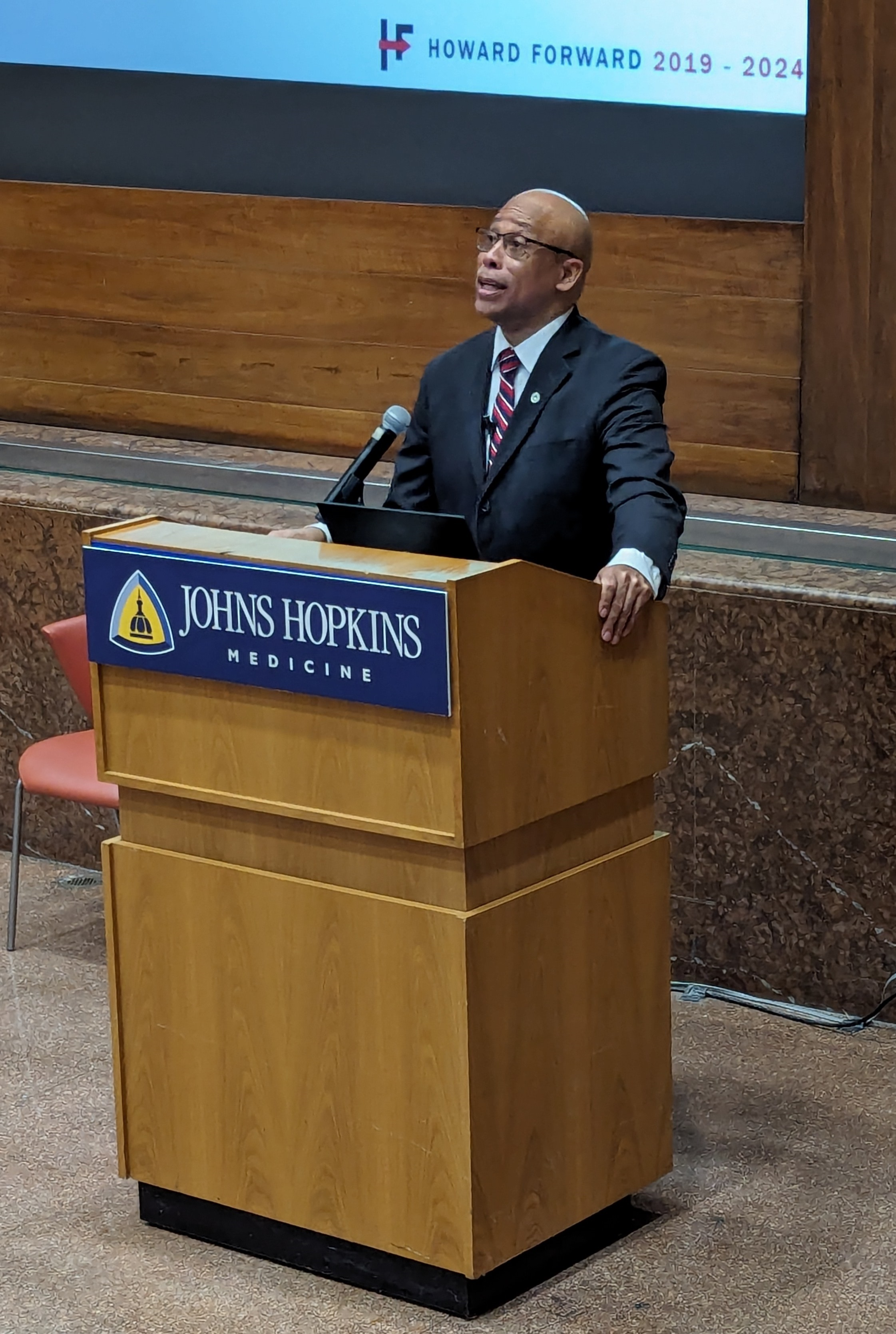
- Dr. Quinn Capers IV speaking at Johns Hopkins Hospital Medical Grand Rounds on 26 April 2024, standing at the lectern in historic Hurd Hall
- Spouse: Cheryl Capers

Academic background
- Education: BS, Zoology, 1987, Howard University; MD, 1991, Ohio State University College of Medicine

Academic work
- Institutions: Rush University Medical Center; Howard University College of Medicine

Quinn Capers IV is an American cardiologist practicing at Rush University Medical Center in Chicago. He is a professor of medicine and vice dean for Faculty Development and Leadership at Rush Medical College. Capers has won numerous awards as a clinician-educator and advocate of diversity enhancement in medicine as an evidence-based method to reduce health disparities. He is an elected Fellow of the American College of Physicians and the American College of Cardiology.

== Early life and education ==
Capers completed his Bachelor of Science degree at Howard University before earning his medical degree at the Ohio State University College of Medicine. Following his MD, Capers trained at Emory University where he completed his internal medicine residency training, cardiology fellowship, and interventional cardiology fellowship.

== Career ==
Capers served 2009–2019 as associate dean for admissions at the OSUCOM. While dean of admissions he led a team that generated a highly cited report describing efforts to measure and mitigate racial bias in medical school admissions. Prior to his departure for UTSW in 2019, Capers was named vice dean for Faculty Affairs at OSUCOM.

In December 2020, Capers was recruited to the University of Texas Southwestern as associate dean for faculty diversity and the inaugural vice chair for diversity and inclusion in the Department of Internal Medicine.

In January 2024, Capers was named chair of the Department of Medicine at Howard University School of Medicine.

== Honors and awards ==
- 2018 Laennec Clinician-Educator Award from the American Heart Association's Council on Clinical Cardiology Leadership; invited lecture titled, "The Lack of Diversity in the US Physician and Cardiology Workforce is a Public Health Emergency: The Way Forward".
- 2019 OSUCOM Professor of the Year.
- 2020 American Association of Medical Colleges Group on Diversity and Inclusion (GDI) Exemplary Leadership Award
- 2021 Association of University Cardiologists (elected honorific society).
- 2022 American College of Physicians opening ceremony keynote speaker
- 2023 Greenfield lecture at Duke University
- 2024 John E. Chapman lecture at Vanderbilt University
- 2024 Myron L. Weisfeldt Distinguished Visiting Professorship in Diversity at Johns Hopkins Hospital
