= Clare Francis (science critic) =

Whistleblower pseudonym

Clare Francis is a pseudonym used since 2010 by the author (or authors) of hundreds of whistle-blowing emails sent to the editors of scientific journals that call attention to suspected cases of plagiarism and fabricated or duplicated figures. Described as a scientific gadfly, the pseudonymous Francis is "a source both legendary and loathed in biomedical circles" for their "uncanny knack for seeing improperly altered images, as well as smaller flaws that some editors are inclined to ignore." Francis refers to themself as an "attentive reader"; their "real identity, gender, and occupation remain secret."

== Mixed response from editors ==
Francis's complaints have been determined on a number of occasions to be valid; for example, in 2013, the Journal of Cellular Biology retracted an article published in 2006 after Francis brought image manipulation to the editors' attention.

Francis's complaints, however, are not always acted upon, as some editors do not wish to respond to anonymous whistleblowers and have found some of Francis's claims to be lacking in verifiability or even a waste of time to investigate.

Tom Reller of Elsevier explains how publishers deal with Francis:

Generally speaking, Clare was rather disruptive at first, but by now most editors and publishing teams have an approach in place when it comes to managing Clare’s demands and threats. Clare's emails are read and assessed, but they’ve set boundaries in regard to what kinds of cases they’ll investigate, how far back, and how many papers they'll look into before deciding if it's warranted to go any further. (Many cases will require cross referencing one piece of original research with 5, 10 or more suspected papers to plagiarize it).

In a Lab Times editorial, Adam Marcus and Ivan Oransky, who run the Retraction Watch blog, argue that journal editors "should stop ignoring anonymous whistle-blowers" such as Francis.
