= Ohio State East Hospital =

Hospital in Columbus, Ohio

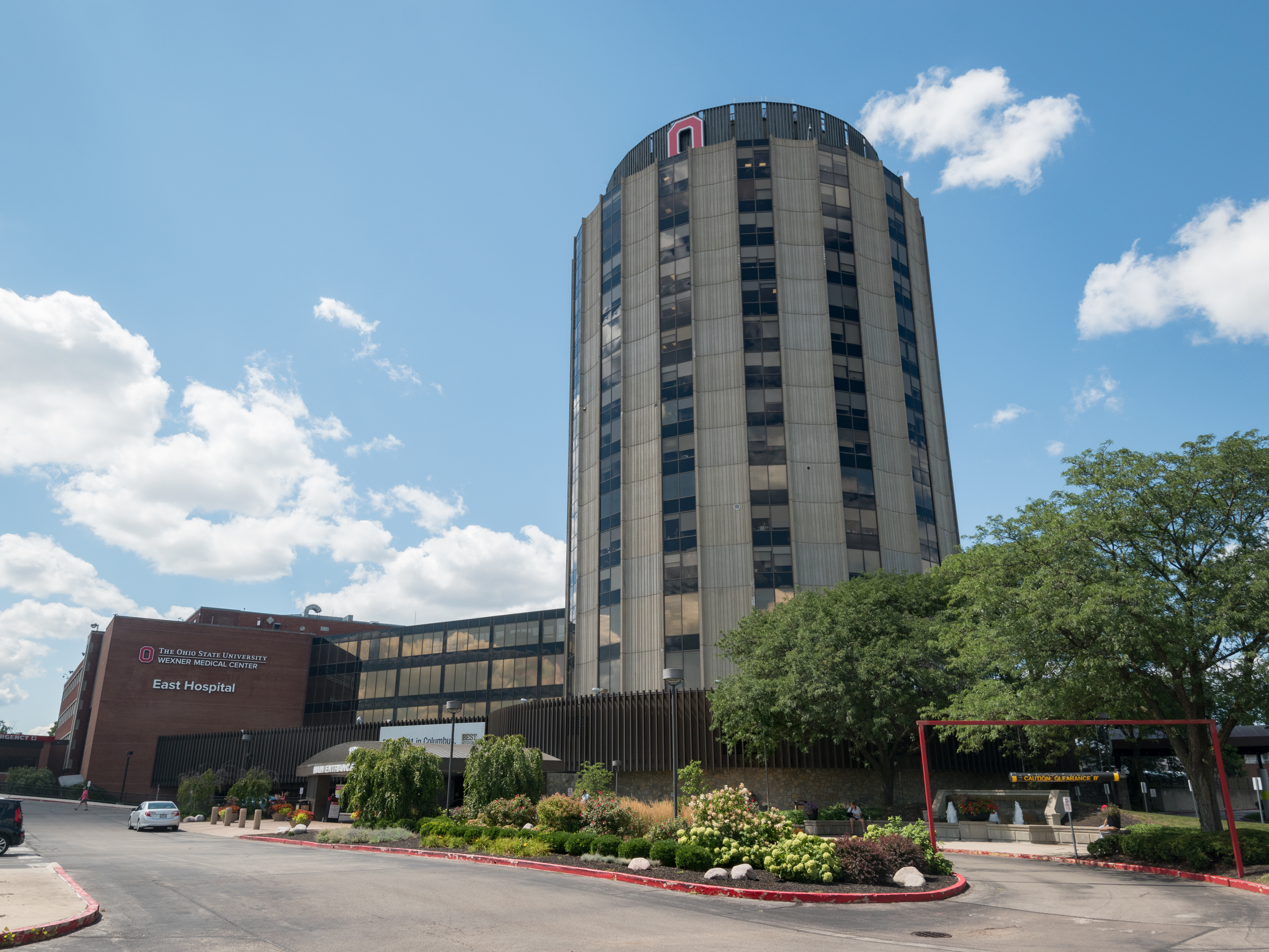

Geography
- Location: 181 Taylor Avenue, Columbus, Ohio, United States
- Coordinates: 39°58′14″N 82°57′47″W

Organization
- Care system: Private
- Type: Academic
- Affiliated university: The Ohio State University

Services
- Emergency department: Level III trauma center
- Beds: 190

Helipads
- Helipad: FAA LID: 2OI6

History
- Opened: 1890

Links
- Website: Official website
- Lists: Hospitals in Ohio

The Ohio State East Hospital is a university hospital in King-Lincoln Bronzeville, Columbus, Ohio. The hospital has a Level III trauma center, an emergency department, and provides numerous inpatient and outpatient services. It is part of the Wexner Medical Center, administered by the Ohio State University.

The Ohio State University maintains its orthopedic, wound care, and specialty blood vessel surgery programs at the hospital. As of 2013, it is the neighborhood's largest employer, and only expected to expand its presence there.

== History ==
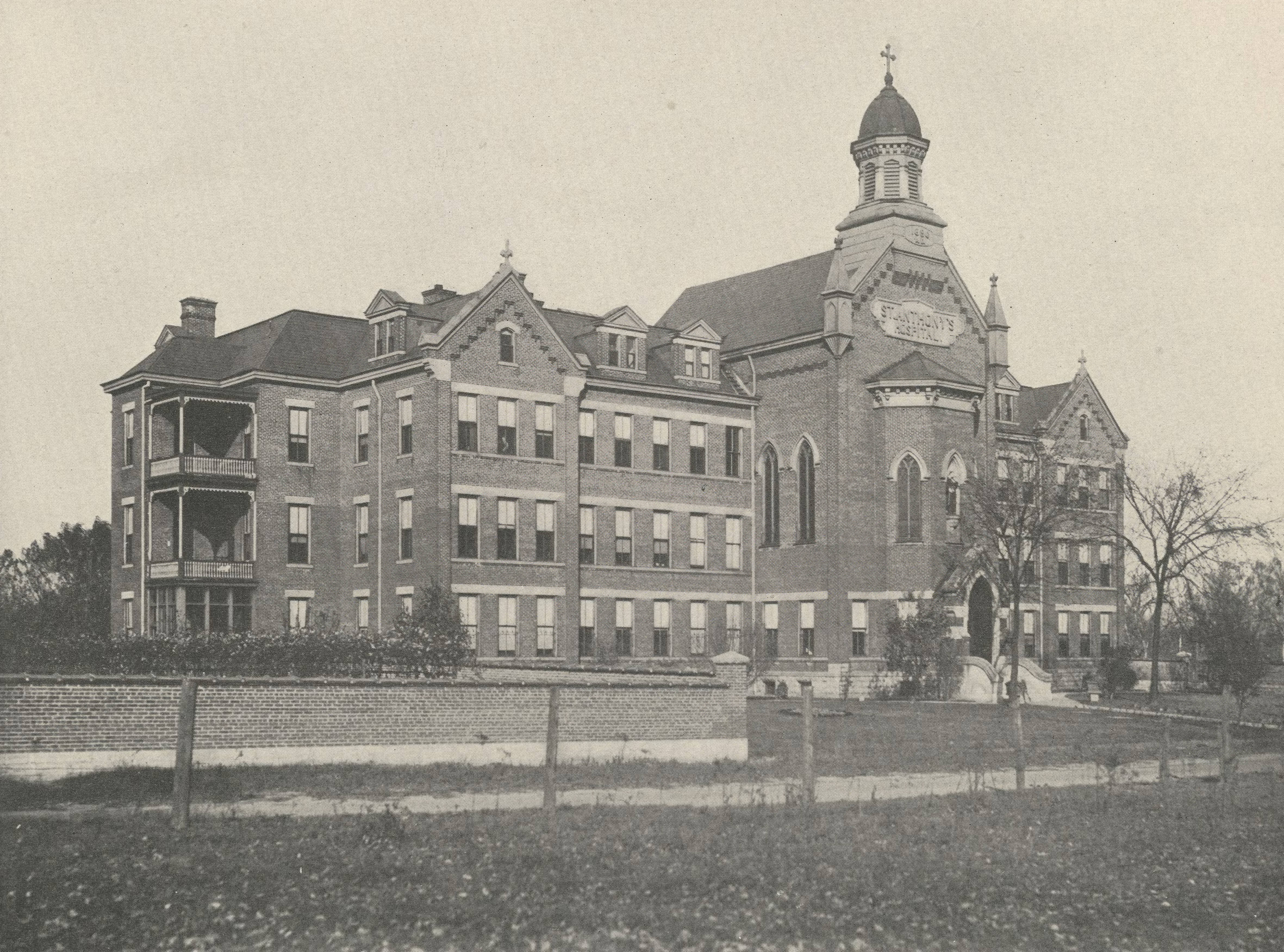
The hospital as St. Anthony's, 1903

The site was formerly a brickyard before the first medical facility was constructed there. The Sisters of the Poor of St. Francis began construction of St. Anthony's Hospital there in 1890; the Sisters had already been operating St. Francis Hospital (present-day Grant Medical Center), though overcrowding and demand on the East Side propelled the decision to build an additional hospital. The building, a four-story structure on a 7-acre (2.8 ha) plot, opened in 1891, and was dedicated on November 22 of that year by bishop John Ambrose Watterson.

The hospital's west wings were built in the 1960s, and the old hospital building was torn down in 1970. The hospital gained its most distinctive modern feature in 1971 – a tall cylindrical tower with a Modernist design. The 16-story tower was designed with all private rooms, unique in 1971. In 1992, Quorum Health Group purchased it, renaming it Park Medical Center. The Ohio State University (OSU) acquired it for about $13 million in 1999. In 2018, it was announced that the tower and west wings will be demolished and replaced with more spacious and modern hospital facilities in further years, with a project cost of $26 million. The campus will expand and shift westward, after OSU purchased 2.7 acres there in 2017.

== Attributes ==
The 16-story tower was designed by Leon Ransom, the first known African American architect of prominence in the city. He also designed the similarly cylindrical Christopher Inn, demolished in 1988. The building was a notable entry in a Columbus Landmarks–hosted mid-century modern architecture survey in 2011-12. In 2024, the tower was placed on the organization's endangered buildings list.

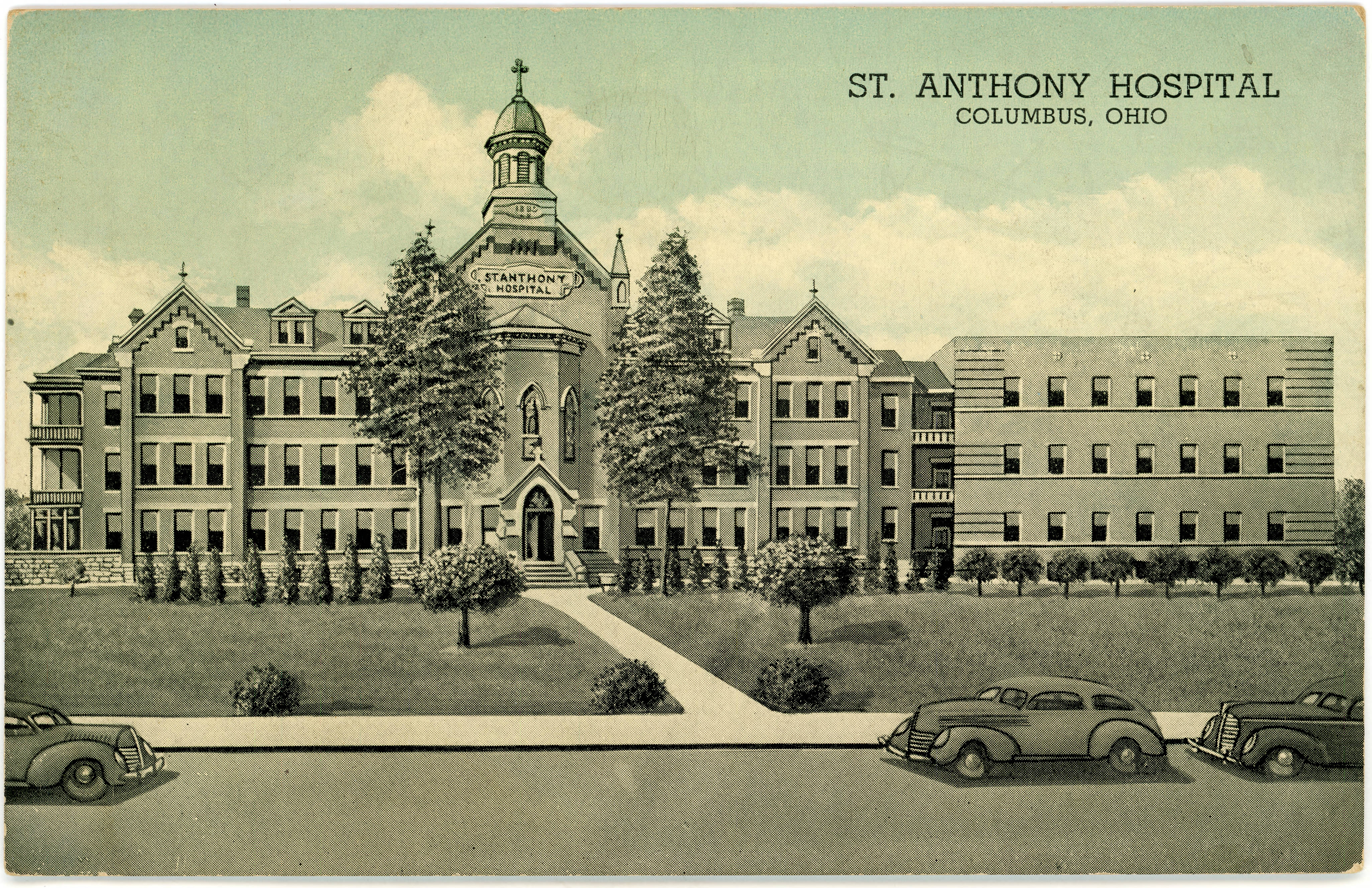
Mid-century postcard of the hospital

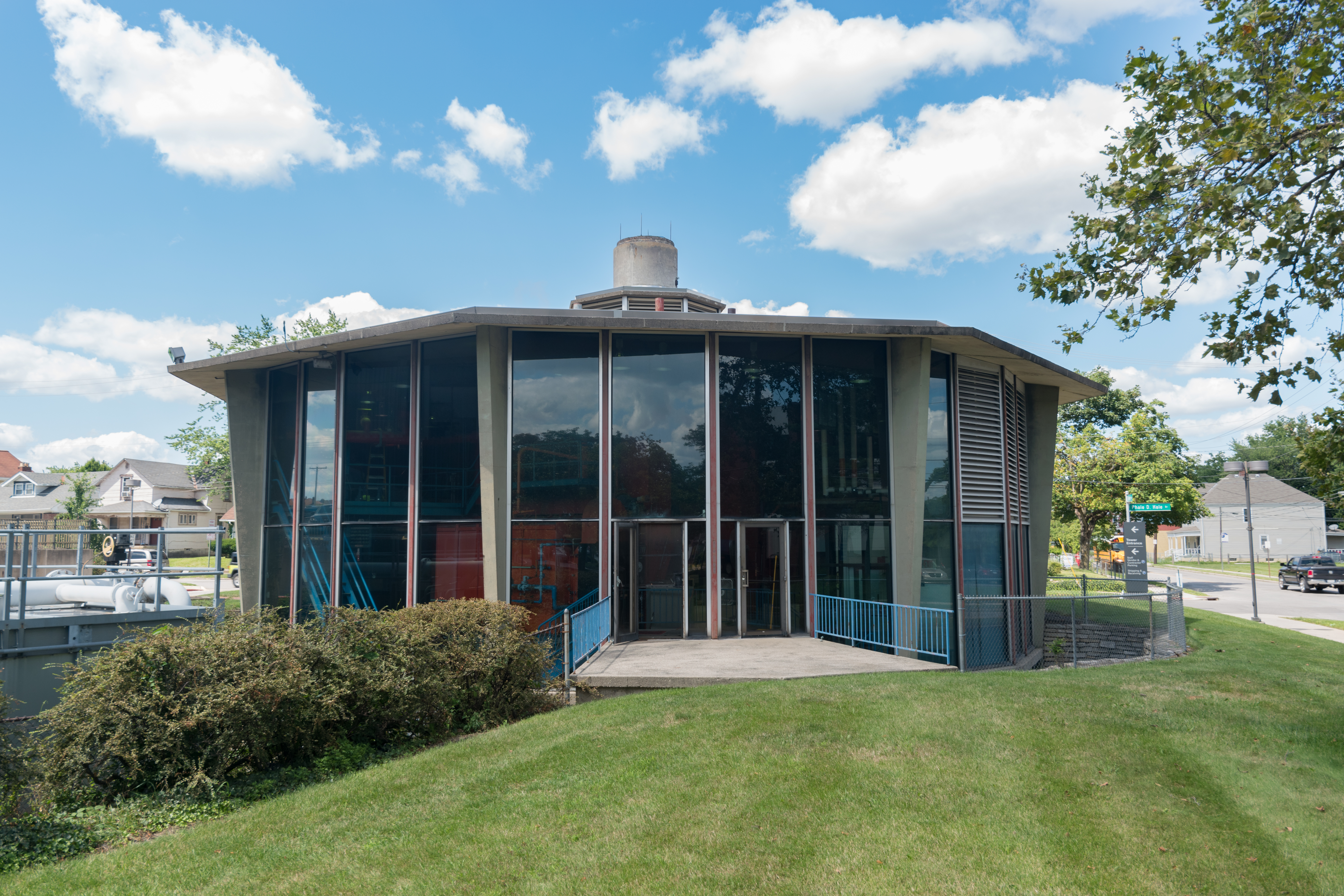
Midcentury building on the site

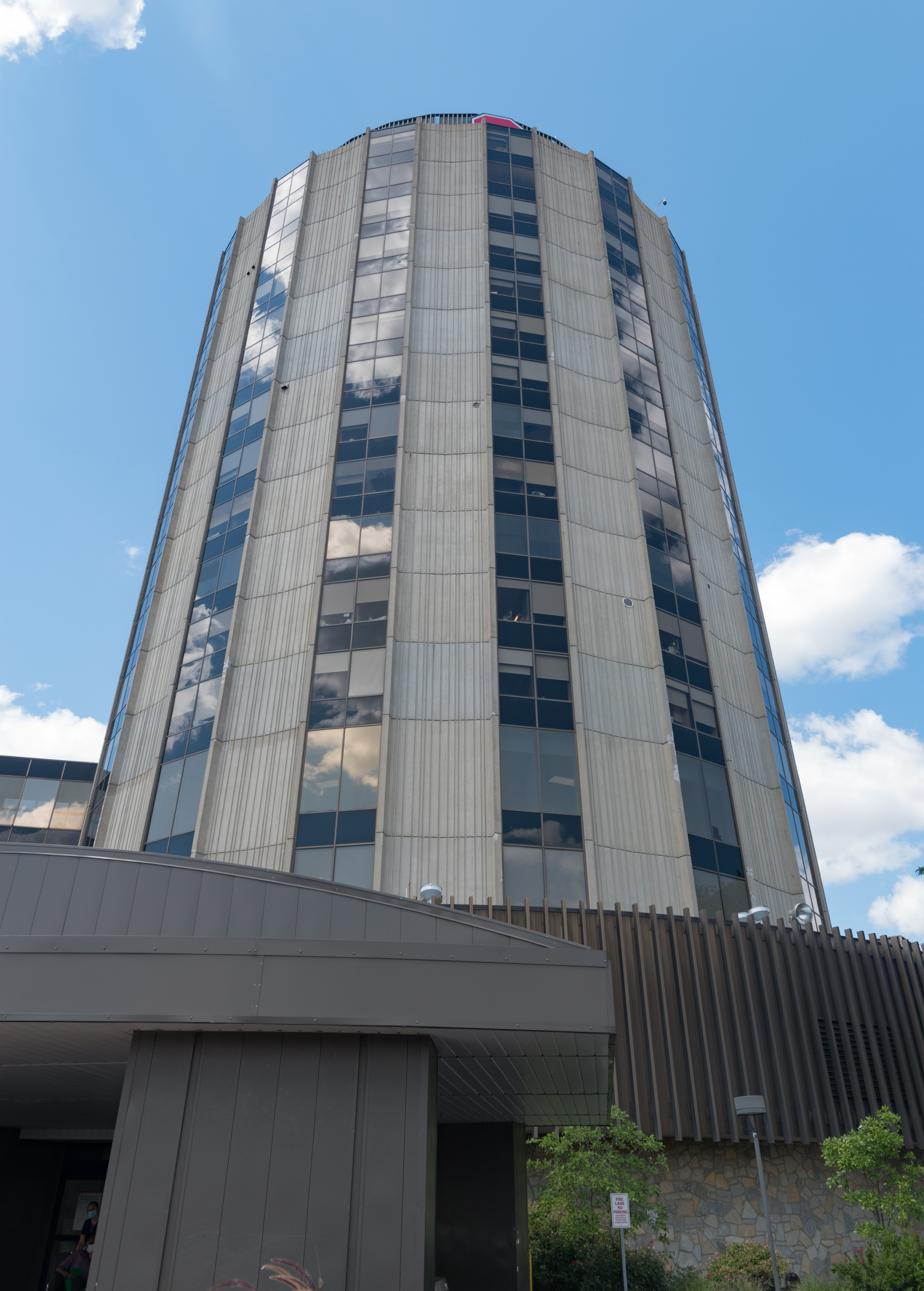
Tower closeup
