= Ching-Shih Chen =

Cancer researcher

Ching-Shih Chen is the former Lucius A. Wing Chair of Cancer Research and professor of medicinal chemistry at Ohio State University (OSU). In 2018, Chen resigned his positions at OSU, and the university released a report on an investigation into Chen's scientific misconduct. As of 2020, Chen has had ten of his research publications retracted, two papers have received an expression of concern, and five others have been corrected.

Chen was reported to university officials and the federal Office of Research Integrity after an anonymous email was sent to the university based on suspicion of falsifying data in six research projects. During the investigation, reports of falsification in additional projects arose. Chen initially blamed postdoctoral fellows and laboratory staff for the issues, but after a university investigation concluded that Chen "deviat[ed] from the accepted practices of image handling and figure generation and intentionally falsif[ied] data" in 14 instances, including at least eight research papers, Chen admitted to research misconduct and resigned. The university made the investigation report publicly available. The report found that Chen engaged in dishonest research practices beginning in 2001 and continuing throughout his career at OSU.

Chen, who received a Ph.D. from the University of Wisconsin, is a fellow of the American Association for the Advancement of Science. In 2010, Chen received the Innovator of the Year award from OSU, with the university later determining that Chen's awarded research was falsified.

== See also ==
- List of scientific misconduct incidents
- Carlo M. Croce
