= Carlo M. Croce =

Italian–American professor of medicine

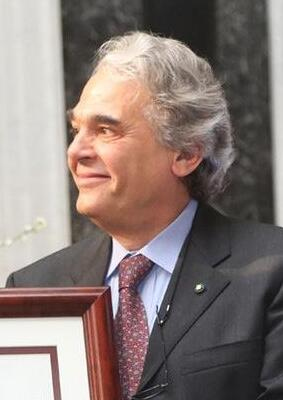
- Carlo Maria Croce, in 2013
- Born: Carlo Maria Croce; December 17, 1944 (age 81); Milan, Italy
- Occupation: oncologist

Carlo Maria Croce (born December 17, 1944) is an Italian-American professor of medicine at Ohio State University, specializing in oncology and the molecular mechanisms underlying cancer. Croce and his research have attracted public attention because of multiple allegations of scientific misconduct.

== Education and career ==
Croce graduated in 1969 summa cum laude in medicine from La Sapienza University of Rome. His research career in the United States began the following year at the Wistar Institute of Biology and Anatomy in Philadelphia. In 1980, Croce was named Wistar Professor of Genetics at the University of Pennsylvania and associate director of the Wistar Institute, and from 1988-1991 he was director of the Fels Institute for Cancer Research and Molecular Biology at Temple University School of Medicine. In 1991, Croce was named Director of the Kimmel Cancer Center at Jefferson Medical College at the Thomas Jefferson University in Philadelphia. In 1994, Croce joined the Council for Tobacco Research's scientific advisory board, where he remained until the group closed after the Tobacco Master Settlement Agreement. During that time, tobacco companies used Croce's research into fragile histidine triad (FHIT) to argue that lung cancer was an inherited condition. While at Jefferson, Croce and his research team discovered in 2002 a role of microRNAs in cancer pathogenesis and progression.

In 2004, Croce moved to Ohio State University (OSU), where he had been an external advisor since 1988, receiving an initial salary of $475,000 and taking with him over 100 staff.

In 2013, Croce resigned from the Ri.MED Foundation's scientific committee due to its director's support for the controversial Stamina therapy.

In 2016, Croce was paid more than $850,000 by Ohio State. In 2019, Croce was removed as chair of the Department of Cancer Biology and Genetics at OSU, and he subsequently sued OSU to be reinstated. His request for a temporary restraining order was denied but he retained his salary of $804,461 per year. Although Croce publicly stated that he was given no reason for his removal as chair, OSU produced a letter that provided such reasons, including that Croce "failed to provide appropriate evaluation and guidance for the faculty", "has been resistant to following normal procedures for developing faculty letters of offer and determining salary parameters", "has also not met some of the basic chair responsibilities regarding governance of the Department", and "is deficient in his ability to manage university and department finances". Regarding the latter, OSU has reported that Croce "mismanaged funds and engaged in non-compliance in clinical trials".

Croce has received over $86 million in federal grants as a principal investigator, with $29.1 million received since he joined Ohio State.

== Investigations into scientific misconduct ==
Croce's research and publications have been scrutinized by the scientific community for possible scientific misconduct, including image and data manipulation. While working at Jefferson, federal investigators alleged Croce and a colleague had submitted false claims for research never undertaken. The university settled the allegations, paying $2.6 million to the government without admitting any wrongdoing. In 2007, OSU investigated Croce for misconduct after the National Institutes of Health (NIH) returned a funding application that contained major portions identical to an application submitted months earlier by Croce's junior colleague. OSU later cleared Croce of misconduct after accusations that he had patented a researcher's work without providing proper credit, that members of his lab had inappropriately used grant money for personal trips abroad, and that Croce improperly pressured colleagues for research attribution. Since 2013, several scientists have claimed research misconduct on the part of Croce, and as of 2020 these allegations remain under investigation by the federal Office of Research Integrity (ORI). Members of the scientific community have pointed out the "tremendous conflict of interest" attached to OSU's investigations of Croce, as Croce's federal research funding includes $8.7 million provided directly to the university in overhead costs.

In 2013, following accusations from science critic Clare Francis of image manipulation in over 30 research papers, OSU instructed Croce to correct or retract some of his research publications; in 2015, the journal Clinical Cancer Research issued a correction after being contacted on the matter by a newspaper. In 2014, the Proceedings of the National Academy of Sciences of the United States of America dismissed a challenge that Croce's 2005 paper on the WWOX gene contained manipulated western blots, but in 2017 the journal agreed to correct the paper after consulting with experts. In 2016, Croce was found to have plagiarized a paper he published in PLoS One from six separate sources. In 2017, the journal Cell Death and Differentiation retracted a paper Croce had published in 2010 after it learned that images had been copied from a 2008 paper published in another journal. Also in 2017, the Journal of Biological Chemistry retracted a paper Croce had published in 2008 due to image/figure irregularities.

In 2018, two cancer researchers at OSU, Samson T. Jacob and Ching-Shih Chen, both colleagues and co-authors with Croce on two papers each, were found to have engaged in scientific misconduct.

In July 2022, Nature reported that the internal OSU inquiry over scientific misconduct in Croce's lab resulted in the identification of a number of cases, including plagiarism and data-falsification, affecting publications by two researchers of the lab. Croce himself was not found guilty of research misconduct, but investigators criticized his management, and OSU told him to retract multiple additional papers. Subsequently four additional articles have been retracted

As of 2024, 15 of Croce's research publications have been retracted, five others have received an expression of concern, and 23 others have been corrected.

== Litigation ==
On May 10, 2017, Croce filed a lawsuit against The New York Times and several of its writers and editors for defamation, invasion of privacy, and intentional infliction of emotional distress based on their reporting of the scientific misconduct allegations. In November 2018, United States District Judge James Graham dismissed virtually all of Croce's lawsuit. In 2017 Croce also filed a defamation lawsuit against critic David Sanders of Purdue University, who was quoted in The New York Times article. In May 2020 Croce lost the defamation lawsuit against Sanders (within the deposition phase of which Croce stated, "I am considered like the Pope of the genetics of leukemias and lymphomas."), with the presiding judge writing that "[d]iscovery has proved the existence of about 30 instances of fabrication or duplication" in Croce's research papers." Croce lost his appeals in both The New York Times and Sanders cases, with appellate judges in the latter case writing that Croce's "papers contained problems outside the range of acceptable research". In 2019 Croce lost a lawsuit he brought against Ohio State University to be reinstated as chair of the Department of Cancer Genetics and Biology, and in 2021 Croce lost the appeal of that decision.

Croce also sued OSU to be reinstated as department chair. Croce lost that suit on summary judgment.

In June 2020, Croce, who has been described by Sanders as "a serial plaintiff", was sued by the law firm Kegler Brown Hill + Ritter, of Columbus, OH, for $923,445.51 in unpaid fees associated with Croce's defamation lawsuits related to his scientific misconduct. In January 2021, Croce was sued by the law firm James E. Arnold & Associates, of Columbus, OH, for over $690,000 in unpaid legal fees associated with Croce's lawsuits related to his scientific misconduct. In December 2022, Croce was ordered by the Franklin County (OH) Court of Common Pleas to pay Kegler Brown Hill + Ritter over one million dollars for unpaid invoices.

== Personal life ==
Croce has said Columbus, Ohio lacks culture, motivating him to spend more of his time traveling than on campus. Croce privately collects Italian Renaissance and Baroque paintings, with a claimed ability to identify and purchase genuine masters for a fraction of their worth. In 2023 Croce's art collection was ordered by the state of Ohio to be sold in order to pay Croce's nearly $1.1 million debt to lawyers who represented him in his failed libel and defamation suits.

== Awards ==
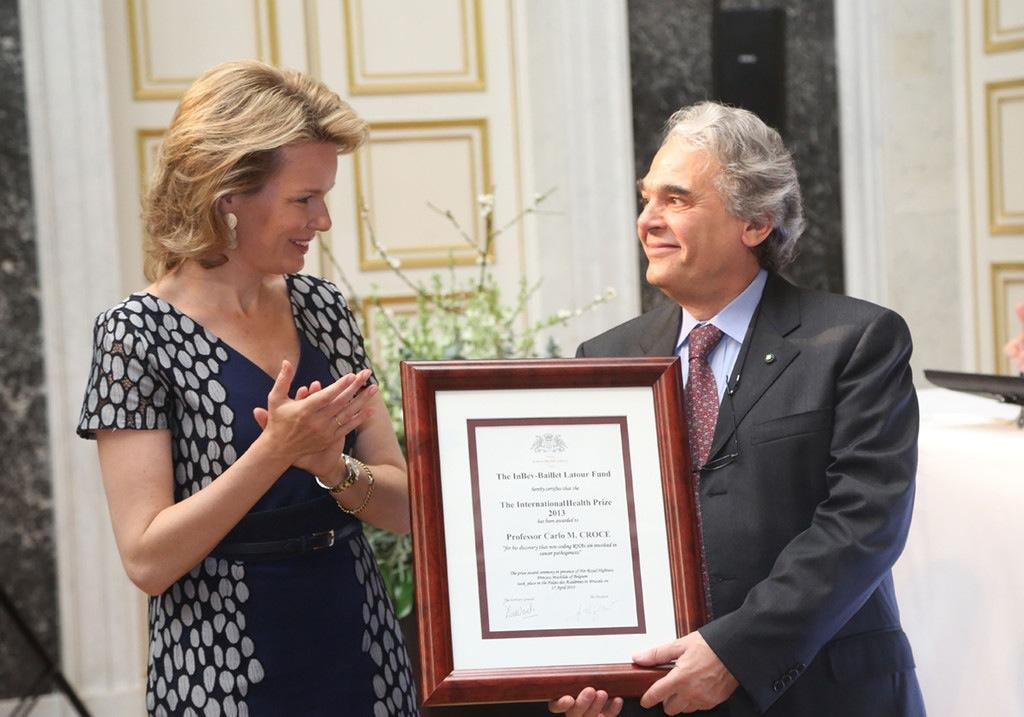
The 2013 prize of the Artois-Baillet Latour Foundation is given by The Queen of the Belgians to Croce

In 2006 Croce received the Clowes Memorial Award from the American Association for Cancer Research for his discoveries of the molecular mechanisms of leukemia. In 2010, he was elected a fellow of the American Academy of Arts and Sciences. In 2011, he received the Award for Excellence in Molecular Diagnostics from the Association for Molecular Pathology. In 2017, Croce received the Margaret Foti Award from the AACR for Leadership and Extraordinary Achievements in Cancer Research. In 2025, Croce was awarded the prestigious Antonio Feltrinelli Prize for Medicine by the Accademia dei Lincei.

== See also ==
- List of scientific misconduct incidents
