= Splenic lymphoma with villous lymphocytes =

Splenic lymphoma with villous lymphocytes is a rare type of lymphoma that involves mature B cells. Older names include lymphoma simulating hairy cell leukemia and lymphoplasmacytic lymphoma with circulating villous lymphocytes. The characteristic villous lymphocytes will appear in a blood smear of the peripheral blood of patients with this type of lymphoma. These lymphocytes will have an oval nucleus with the “cobblestone” pattern of nuclear chromatin typical of more mature lymphoid cells. The cytoplasmic projections, or villi, are found in a polar distribution. Whether this condition is identical to splenic marginal zone lymphoma, or only highly similar, is a matter of debate.
