= Organization and expression of immunoglobulin genes =

The organization and expression of immunoglobulin genes are fundamental processes that enable the adaptive immune system to produce a vast repertoire of antibodies, essential for recognizing and neutralizing diverse antigens.

Antibody (or immunoglobulin) quaternary structure is made up of two heavy-chains and two light-chains. These chains are held together by disulfide bonds. The arrangement of genes and processes that put together different parts of antibody molecules play important roles in antibody diversity and production of different classes or subclasses of antibodies. The organization of genes is relatively conserved in stem cell precursors, and processes take place during the development and differentiation of B cells that lead to many different arrangements of variable segments. That is, the controlled gene expression during transcription and translation coupled with the rearrangements of immunoglobulin gene segments result in the generation of antibody repertoire during development and maturation of B cells.

== B-Cell development ==
During the development of B cells, the immunoglobulin gene undergoes sequences of rearrangements that lead to formation of the antibody repertoire. For example, in the early stages of transition from pro-B cell to pre-B cell, a partial rearrangement of the heavy-chain gene occurs which is followed by complete rearrangement of heavy-chain gene. At this stage (Pre-B cell), the μ heavy chain and surrogate light chain are formed. The final rearrangement of the light chain gene generates immature B cell and membrane-bound IgM (mIgM). The process explained here occurs during development of naïve B cells, prior to exposure to exogenous antigens. The mature B cell formed as a result of these processing changes leaves the bone marrow and may then be stimulated by an antigen to develop into antibody-secreting plasma cells. Also at first, the mature B cell expresses membrane-bound IgD and IgM. These two classes could switch to secretory IgD and IgM during the processing of mRNAs.

Finally, further class switching follows as the cell continues to divide and differentiate. For instance, a B cell expressing IgM can switch to IgG, IgA, or IgE depending on the stimulus provided (which may be dependent upon the antigenic source and the responding immune cells).

== The multigene organization of immunoglobulin genes ==
From studies and predictions such as Dreyer and Bennett's, it shows that the light chains and heavy chains are encoded by separate multigene families on different chromosomes. They are referred to as gene segments and are separated by non-coding regions. The rearrangement and organization of these gene segments during the maturation of B cells produce functional proteins. The entire process of rearrangement and organization of these gene segments is the vital source where our body immune system gets its capabilities to recognize and respond to variety of antigens.

=== Light chain multigene family ===
The light chain gene has three gene segments. These include: the light chain variable region (V), joining region (J), and constant region (C) gene segments. The variable region of light is therefore encoded by the rearrangement of VJ segments. The light chain can be either kappa,κ or lambda,λ. This process takes place at the level of mRNAs processing. Random rearrangements and recombinations of the gene segments at DNA level to form one kappa or lambda light chain occurs in an orderly fashion. As a result, "a functional variable region gene of a light chain contains two coding segments that are separated by a non-coding DNA sequence in unrearranged germ-line DNA".

=== Heavy-chain multigene family ===
Heavy chain contains similar gene segments such as V_{H}, J_{H}, and C_{H}, but also has another gene segment called D (diversity). Unlike the light chain multigene family, VDJ gene segments code for the variable region of the heavy chain. The rearrangement and reorganization of gene segments in this multigene family is more complex . The rearranging and joining of segments produced different end products because these are carried out by different RNA processes. The same reason is why the IgM and IgG are generates at the time.

== Variable-region rearrangements ==
The variable region rearrangements happen in an orderly sequence in the bone marrow. Usually, the assortment of these gene segments occurs at B cell maturation.

== Light chain DNA ==
The kappa and lambda light chains undergo rearrangements of the V and J gene segments. In this process, a functional Vlambda can combine with four functional Jλ –Cλ combinations. On the other hands, Vk gene segments can join with either one of the Jk functional gene segments. The overall rearrangements result in a gene segment order from 5 prime to 3 prime end. These are a short leader (L) exon, a noncoding sequence (intron), a joined VJ segment, a second intron, and the constant region. There is a promoter upstream from each leader gene segment. The leader exon is important in the transcription of light chain by the RNA polymerase. This sequence is translated to guide the polypeptide to the internal environment of the endoplasmic reticulum, but is cleaved and absent from the mature protein. To remain with coding sequence only, the introns are removed during RNA- processing and repairing.

== Heavy chain DNA ==
The rearrangements of heavy-chains are different from the light chains because DNA undergoes rearrangements of V-D-J gene segments in the heavy chains. These reorganizations of gene segments produce gene sequence from 5 prime to 3 prime ends such as a short leader exon, an intron, a joined VDJ segment, a second intron and several gene segments. The final product of the rearrangement is transcribed when RNA polymerase

== Mechanism of variable region rearrangements ==
It is understood that rearrangement occurs between specific sites on the DNA called recombination signal sequences (RSSs). The signal sequences are composed of a conserved palindromic heptamer and a conserved AT- rich nonamer. These signal sequences are separated by non-conserved spacers of 12 or 23 base pairs called one-turn and two-turn respectively. They are within the lambda chain, k-chain and the processes of rearrangement in these regions are catalyzed by two recombination-activating genes: RAG-1 and RAG-2 and other enzymes and proteins. The segments joined due to signals generated RSSs that flank each V, D, and J segments. Only genes flank by 12 -bp that join to the genes flank by 23-bp spacer during the rearrangements and combinations to maintain VL-JL and VH-DH-JH joining.

== Generation of antibody diversity ==
Antibody diversity is produced by genetic rearrangement after shuffling and rejoining one of each of the various gene segments for the heavy and light chains. Due to mixing and random recombination of the gene segments errors can occur at the sites where gene segments join with each other. These errors are one of the sources of the antibody diversity that is commonly observed in both the light and heavy chains. Moreover, when B cells continue to proliferate, mutations accumulate at the variable regions through a process called somatic hypermutation. The high concentrations of these mutations at the variable region also produce high antibody diversity.

== Class-switching ==
When the B cells get activated, class switching can occur. The class switching involves switch regions that made up of multiple copies of short repeats (GAGCT and TGGGG). These switches occur at the level of rearrangements of the DNA because there is a looping event that chops off the constant regions for IgM and IgD and form the IgG mRNAs. Any continuous looping occurrence will produce IgE or IgA mRNAs. In addition, cytokines are factors that have great effects on class switching of different classes of antibodies. Their interaction with B cells provides the appropriates signals needed for B cells differentiation and eventual class switching occurrence. For example, interleukin-4 induces the rearrangements of heavy chain immunoglobulin genes. That is IL- 4 induces the switching of Cμ to Cγ to Cκ
