= The James Cancer Hospital =

Hospital in Columbus, Ohio, USA

The James Cancer Hospital & Solove Research Institute
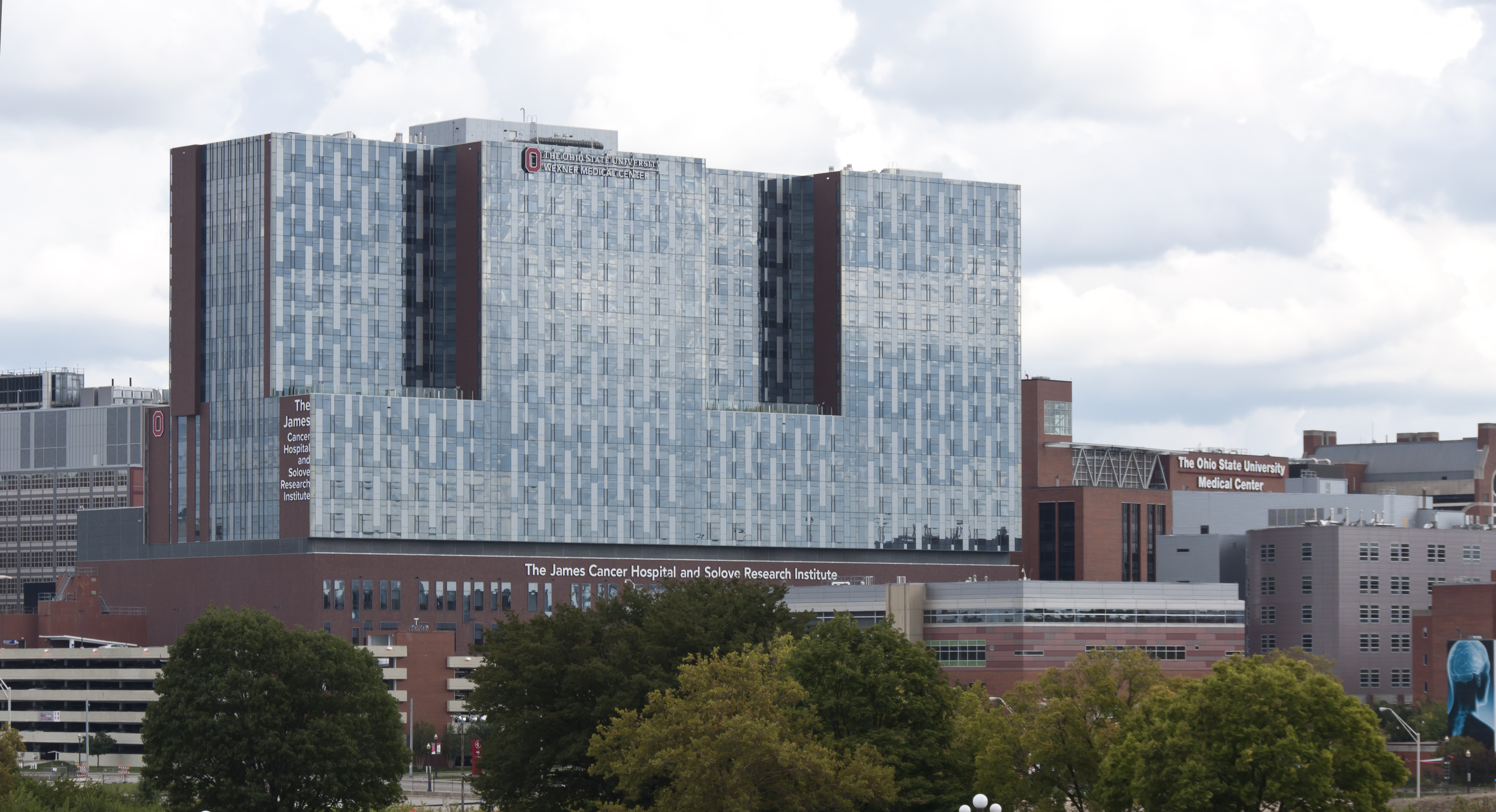

Geography
- Location: Columbus, Ohio, USA
- Coordinates: 39°59′42″N 83°01′11″W

Organisation
- Care system: Public
- Type: Cancer, research
- Affiliated university: Ohio State University
- Network: The James Cancer Network, OSUMC

Services
- Emergency department: James Emergency Department
- Beds: 306

History
- Founded: 1990

Links
- Website: http://www.cancer.osu.edu
- Lists: Hospitals in Ohio

The Arthur G. James Cancer Hospital and Richard J. Solove Research Institute (commonly shortened to just The James) is part of The Ohio State University Wexner Medical Center and is one of the National Cancer Institute's Comprehensive Cancer Centers. It is named after the founder Arthur G. James and is located in Columbus, Ohio, United States.

== History ==
The ground breaking for the hospital was July 10, 1984. It was completed January 16, 1990 but a water main break delayed the opening until July 9, 1990, when the first patient was admitted.The hospital treats cancer, and conducts research in the Solove Research Institute. The James receives donations through the Pelotonia biking event. In 2018, the James Cancer Hospital was designated a magnet hospital by the American Nurses Credentialing Center. After its expansion in 2014, it became the third largest cancer hospital in the United States.

In December 2014, The James opened a new hospital. With more than 1.1 million square feet, and 21 floors, "the New James" is the third largest cancer hospital in the country. Designed by Architecture Firm, HOK, the construction project broke ground in 2010 and was the largest development project in The Ohio State University's history. The cost of construction was $1.1 billion. Every inpatient floor specializes in specific cancer sub-types, has dedicated areas for education as well as a translational research lab.

The James has its own 15 bed emergency department reserved for cancer patients. It is fully integrated with the Medical Center's emergency department.

In 2020, U.S. News & World Report ranked the hospital as the 30th best cancer hospital in the United States.
