= Ohio State University Wexner Medical Center =

Hospital in Columbus, Ohio, United States

- Ohio State Health System

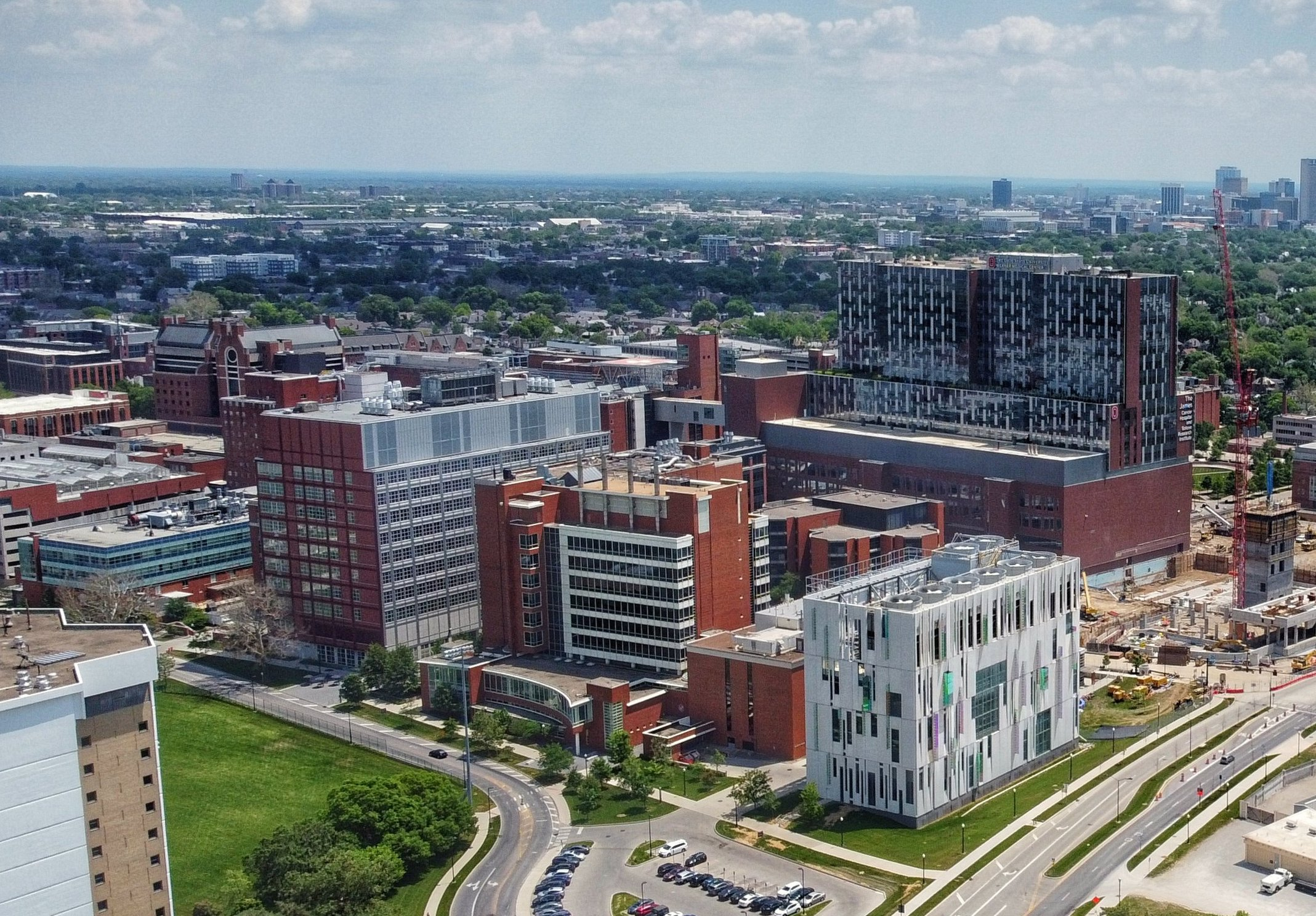

Geography
- Location: The Ohio State University, Columbus, Ohio, United States
- Coordinates: 39°59′43″N 83°01′09″W

Organization
- Care system: State Government Public
- Type: Academic
- Affiliated university: The Ohio State University

Services
- Emergency department: Level I trauma center
- Beds: 1,800+

Helipads
- Helipad: FAA LID: OH54

History
- Opened: 1846

Links
- Website: Official website
- Lists: Hospitals in Ohio

The Ohio State University Wexner Medical Center (OSUWMC) is a multidisciplinary academic medical center located in Columbus, Ohio, United States, on the main campus of The Ohio State University.

== History ==
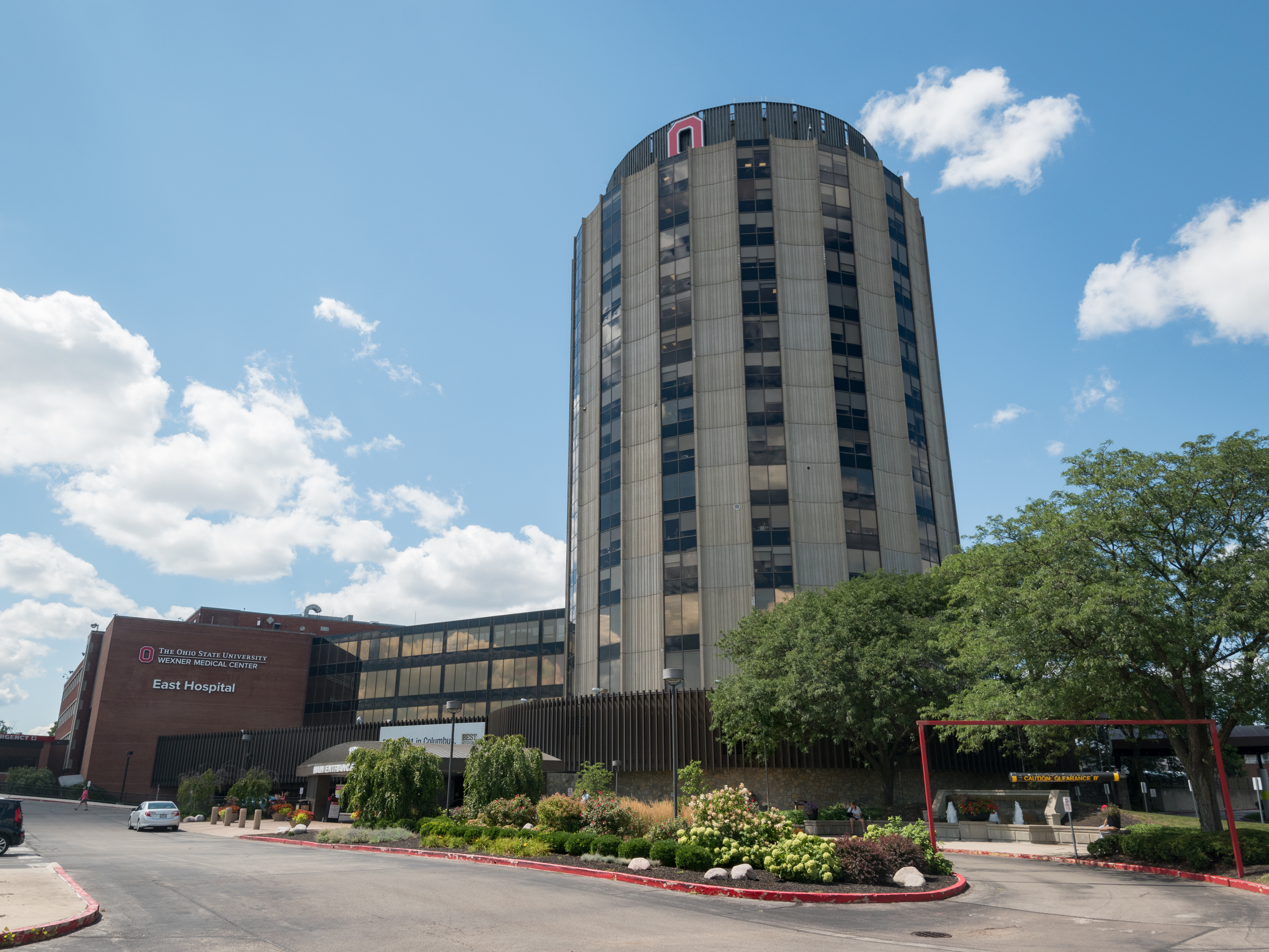
Ohio State East Hospital

The Ohio State Health System includes University Hospital and East Hospital, Ohio State's two full-service teaching hospitals. Other hospitals include Ohio State Harding Hospital, an inpatient and outpatient psychiatric hospital; the Richard M. Ross Heart Hospital, dedicated to the study, treatment and prevention of cardiovascular diseases; Dodd Rehabilitation Hospital, with a rehabilitation inpatient program; and the OSU Primary Care Network, an extensive network of community-based primary and subspecialty care facilities throughout central Ohio.

The medical complex was renamed in 2012 after Les Wexner, the then-chair of the University's Board of Trustees and CEO of Limited Brands who donated $100 million to the university and championed fundraising for its construction.

More than 62,000 inpatients receive medical care annually from The Ohio State University Wexner Medical Center, and the Health System manages more than 1.86 million outpatient visits each year.

The Wexner Medical Center has more than 23,000 employees, including more than 2,000 physicians, more than 1,000 residents and fellows and nearly 5,000 nurses.

Following the release of the Epstein files, which shed light upon Les Wexner's close ties with child sex offender Jeffrey Epstein, protestors submitted a formal name review and called for Wexner's name to be removed from the medical center.

The hospital has faced contract terminations from insurers, including Anthem Blue Cross Blue Shield in 2024, and Humana in 2026.

== Locations ==
=== Inpatient locations ===
==== Ohio State Medical Campus ====
- Dodd Rehabilitation Hospital
- Harding Hospital, psychiatric
- Arthur G James Cancer Hospital and Richard J. Solove Research Institute, oncology
- Richard M. Ross Heart Hospital, cardiovascular
- University Hospital
- University Hospital – Doan Hall
- University Hospital – Pavilion
- University Hospital – Rhodes Hall

==== Off-campus ====
- East Hospital

=== Outpatient locations ===
- Behavioral Health Olentangy River Road
- Comprehensive Transplant Center – Dayton
- Davis Outpatient Care
- Dermatology West
- Ear, Nose and Throat Westerville
- Eye and Ear Institute
- Havener Eye Institute Dublin
- Havener Eye Institute Westerville
- Inflammatory Bowel Disease Center Hilliard
- Internal Medicine and Pediatrics Grandview
- Internal Medicine and Pediatrics Hilliard
- Jameson Crane Sports Medicine Institute
- Martha Morehouse Outpatient Care
- McCampbell Outpatient Care
- Nephrology Bellefontaine
- Nephrology London
- Obstetrics and Gynecology Kenny Road
- Officenter Gahanna
- Ohio State Healthy Community Center
- Outpatient Care Dublin
- Outpatient Care East
- Outpatient Care Gahanna
- Outpatient Care Lewis Center
- Outpatient Care New Albany
- Outpatient Care Pickerington
- Outpatient Care Upper Arlington
- Outpatient Care Worthington
- Outpatient Rehabilitation Powell YMCA
- Philip Heit Center for Healthy New Albany
- Primary Care Beecher Crossing Gahanna
- Primary Care Crown Park
- Primary Care Grove City
- Primary Care Northwood-High
- Primary Care Pataskala
- Primary Care Powell
- Primary Care Stoneridge Dublin
- Primary Care Sunbury
- Primary Care Westerville
- Talbot Hall
- Urgent Care Clintonville
- Urgent Care Rocky Fork Gahanna
- Urgent Care The Well Hilliard

==== The James Outpatient ====
- The James Grove City
- The James Gynecologic Oncology Mill Run
- The James Mammography Pickerington
- The James Outpatient Care
- The Stefanie Spielman Comprehensive Breast Center

== James Cancer Hospital ==
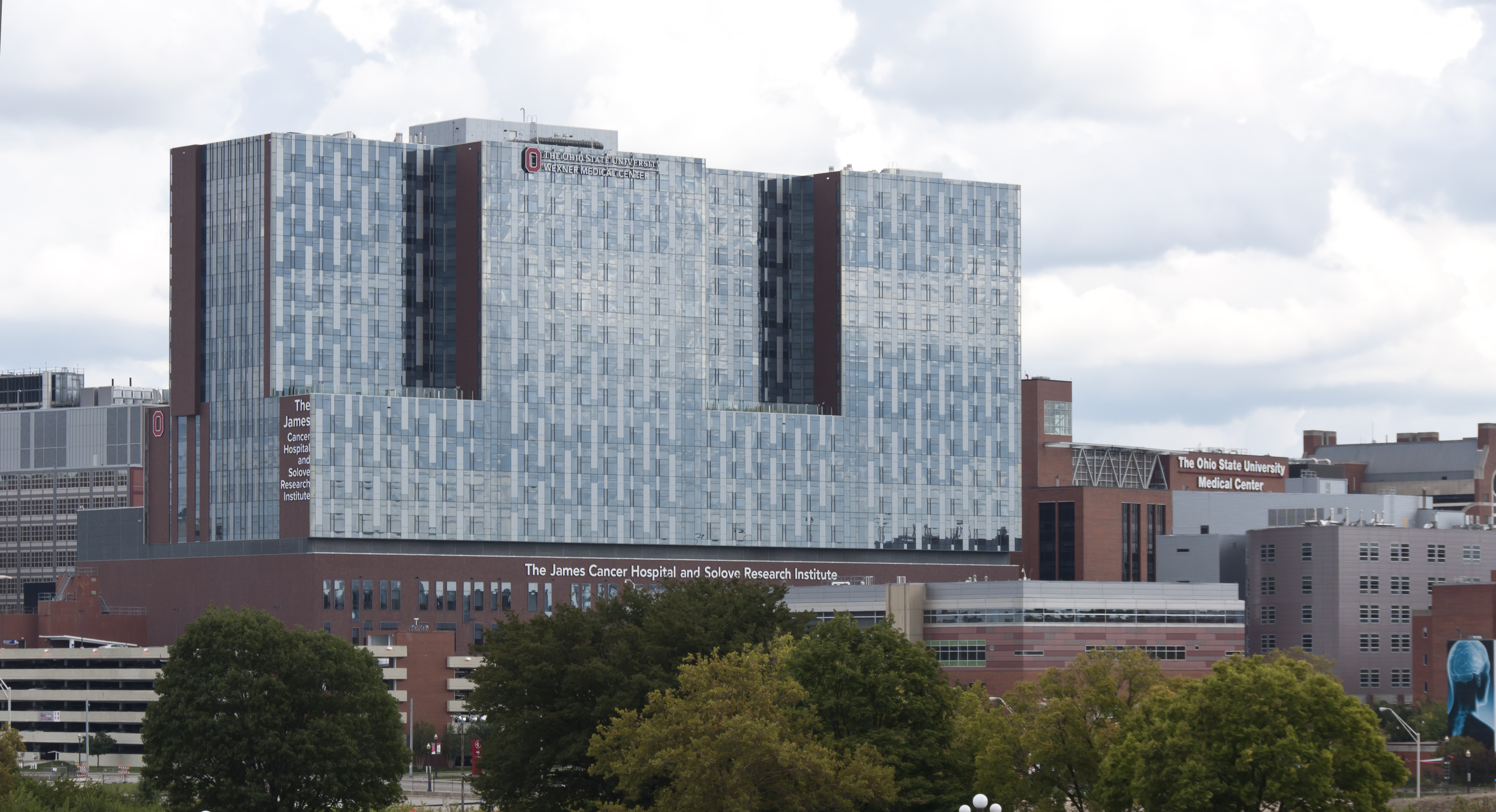
The James Cancer Hospital and Solove Research Institute

The Arthur G James Cancer Hospital and Richard J. Solove Research Institute is a dedicated cancer hospital and research center that is part of the university's Comprehensive Cancer Center, with a governance structure separate from, but coordinated with, Ohio State Wexner Medical Center. The OSUCCC – James is one of several cancer programs in the United States that feature a National Cancer Institute (NCI)-designated comprehensive cancer center aligned with a nationally ranked academic medical center and a freestanding cancer hospital.

== College of Medicine ==
The Ohio State University College of Medicine is the medical school at Ohio State University. The college is recognized in both education and research, as reflected by 2022 rankings in the Top 40 U.S. News & World Report. In the 2022 “Best Graduate Schools” rankings, The Ohio State University College of Medicine ranked 33rd among all research medical schools in the nation.

== Expansion ==
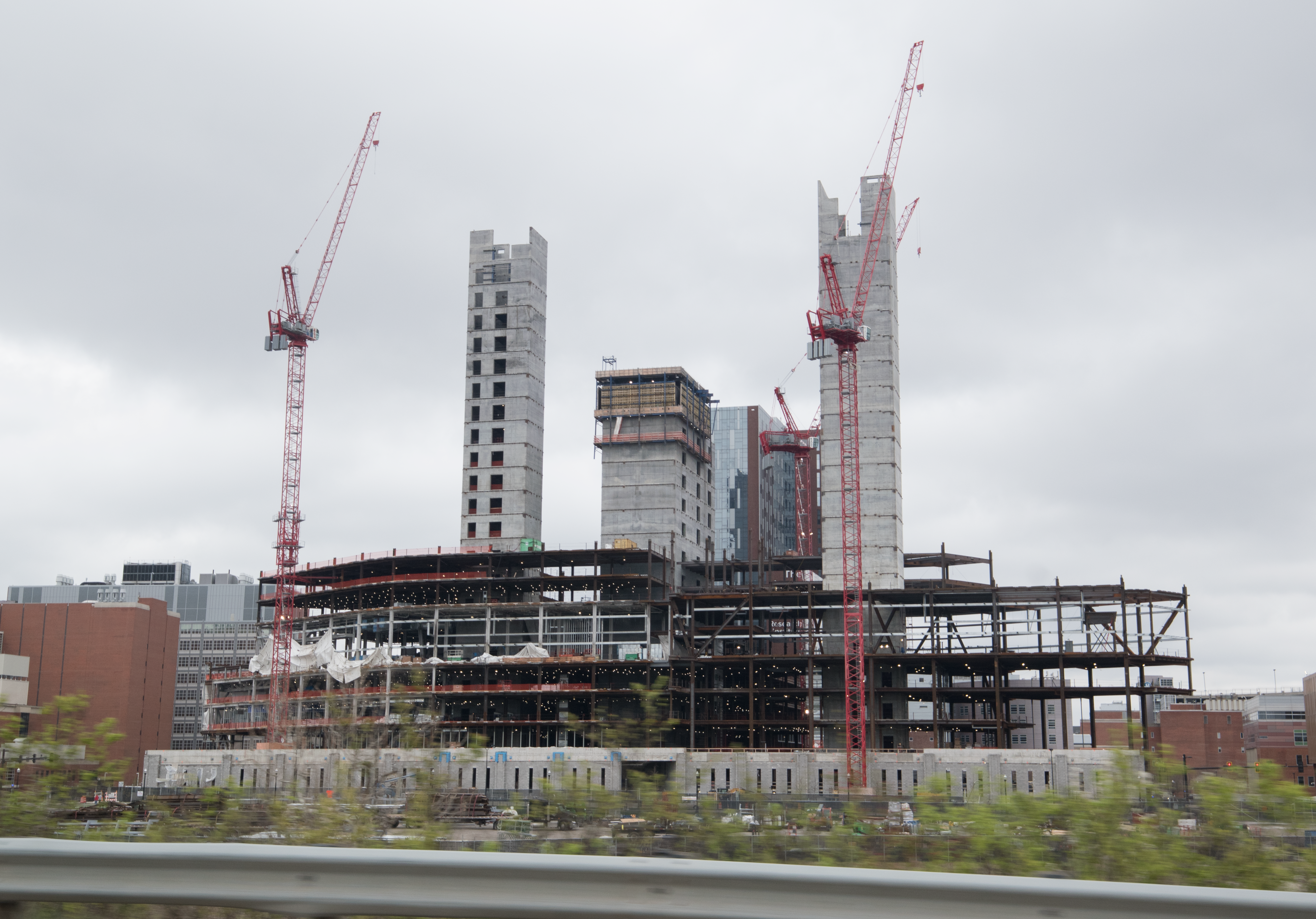
Construction of the new inpatient hospital, 2022

In 2017 Ohio State announced plans for the development of a new hospital and several large ambulatory centers. The new medical center, named University Hospital, is 26 stories and 1.9 million square feet. It has more than 800 beds, 60 neonatal intensive care unit bassinets, and state-of-the-art inpatient service areas. The tower officially opened in February 2026.

== Awards and recognition ==
For 29 consecutive years, U.S. News & World Report has recognized Ohio State Wexner Medical Center specialties in its "Best Hospitals" rankings. In 2021, it recognized 10 Ohio State Wexner Medical Center specialties: Ear, Nose and Throat #8; Diabetes and Endocrinology #19; Cancer #27; Neurology and Neurosurgery #28; Pulmonology and Lung Surgery #29; Urology #31; Rehabilitation #31; Cardiology and Heart Surgery #38; Gynecology #46; and Gastroenterology and GI Surgery #50. USNWR also named the Ohio State Wexner Medical Center the best hospital in central Ohio and the second best hospital in the state. In 2022, only one program was rated in the top 20 (Ear Nose and Throat #19), and two previously ranked programs were unranked (Diabetes and Endocrinology; Urology).
