= Ohio State Richard M. Ross Heart Hospital =

Cardiovascular hospital in Columbus, Ohio, US

Coordinates: 39°59′40″N 83°01′07″W

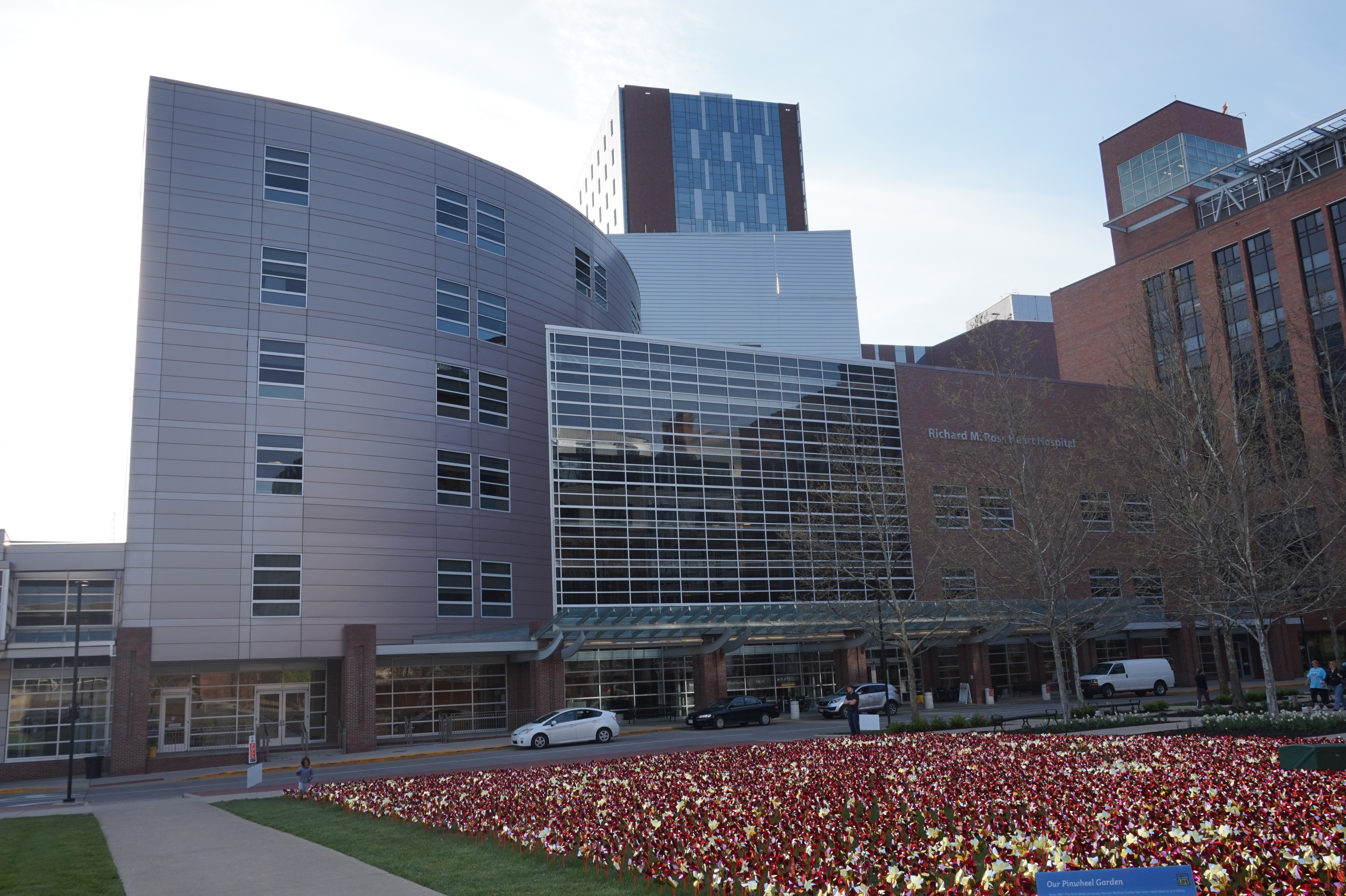
The Richard M. Ross Heart Hospital at The Ohio State University's Wexner Medical Center

The Ohio State Richard M. Ross Heart Hospital is located at Ohio State University in Columbus, Ohio. The hospital specializes in cardiology, and is ranked number 46 in the United States for its heart program by U.S. News & World Report for 2020. Care is provided for patients with cardiovascular disease or peripheral vascular disease. The hospital was the first in the country to perform robotic surgery.

== Description ==
The Richard M. Ross Heart Hospital is part of the Wexner Medical Center, which dates back to 1834. The medical center includes six hospitals, 20 core laboratories, more than a dozen research centers and institutes, a network of primary and specialty care practices, a unified physician practice, and a college of medicine.

The Richard M. Ross Heart Hospital has four levels with a total of 225,000 square feet. It has 20 exam rooms, six operating rooms, with video-conferencing capabilities, six catheterization/intervention and electrophysiology labs, six echocardiography labs, two echo stress test suites, four noninvasive vascular labs, three nuclear stress labs, a cardiovascular CT, a cardiac MR, a cardiac device implant lab, and a transesophageal echo lab.

Two new floors include 60 private critical care patient rooms, 30 for electrophysiology and arrhythmia management, and 30 for management of patients in heart failure. Construction five new elevators and one oversized patient transport elevator.

== Procedures ==
The hospital provides procedures that include:

- Cardiac catheterizations
- Angioplasties
- Open-heart surgery
- Cardiovascular imaging
- Vascular interventions
- Minimally-invasive robotic procedures
- Full range of testing and laboratory services for diagnosing cardiovascular disease
