= 1-alkyl-2-acetylglycerophosphocholine esterase =

Class of enzymes

Identifiers
- EC no.: 3.1.1.47
- CAS no.: 76901-00-3

Databases
- IntEnz: IntEnz view
- BRENDA: BRENDA entry
- ExPASy: NiceZyme view
- KEGG: KEGG entry
- MetaCyc: metabolic pathway
- PRIAM: profile
- PDB structures: RCSB PDB PDBe PDBsum
- Gene Ontology: AmiGO / QuickGO
Search
- PMC: articles
- PubMed: articles
- NCBI: proteins

The enzyme 1-alkyl-2-acetylglycerophosphocholine esterase (EC 3.1.1.47) catalyzes the reaction

1-alkyl-2-acetyl-sn-glycero-3-phosphocholine + H_{2}O $\rightleftharpoons$ 1-alkyl-sn-glycero-3-phosphocholine + acetate

The former is also known as platelet-activating factor. There are multiple enzymes with this function:

- Lipoprotein-associated phospholipase A2
- Platelet-activating factor acetylhydrolase 2, cytoplasmic
- Platelet-activating factor acetylhydrolase 1b: regulatory subunit 1, catalytic subunit 2, catalytic subunit 3

This enzyme belongs to the family of hydrolases, specifically those acting on carboxylic ester bonds. The systematic name of this enzyme class is 1-alkyl-2-acetyl-sn-glycero-3-phosphocholine acetohydrolase. Other names in common use include 1-alkyl-2-acetyl-sn-glycero-3-phosphocholine acetylhydrolase, and alkylacetyl-GPC:acetylhydrolase. This enzyme participates in ether lipid metabolism.

== Structural studies ==
As of late 2007, 7 structures have been solved for this class of enzymes, with PDB accession codes 1BWP, 1BWQ, 1BWR, 1ES9, 1FXW, 1VYH, and 1WAB.
