= Wallace C. Steinberg =

American venture capitalist

Wallace H. Steinberg (1934–1995) was an American venture capitalist and chairman of Healthcare Investment Corp., a venture capital fund focused on the healthcare sector.

== Life and career ==
Steinberg earned a bachelor's in pharmacology and a master's in pharmaceutical chemistry from Rutgers University. He served as a technical director at Sterling Drug before a 21-year tenure at Johnson & Johnson. While at Johnson & Johnson, he contributed to the development of the Reach toothbrush.

Steinberg was instrumental in early investments in gene therapy and the exploration of animal-to-human organ transplantation. He was among the early supporters of Craig Venter's work, which led to the decoding of the full gene set of the bacterium Hemophilus influenzae. He founded Biotransplant in March 1990 with an interest in furthering the potential of animal organ transplantation into humans. David Sachs, formerly with the National Institutes of Health, was recruited to lead the company's scientific initiatives.

Steinberg also established the Institute for Genomic Research, a nonprofit entity, in collaboration with Dr. Venter. This institution aimed to encourage genomic research, but it also had an agreement that any significant discoveries would be first analyzed by Human Genome Sciences, another of Steinberg's ventures, before publication.
