= Mapatumumab =

Monoclonal antibody

Monoclonal antibody
- Type: Whole antibody
- Source: Human
- Target: TRAIL-receptor (death receptor 4)

Clinical data
- ATC code: none

Identifiers
- CAS Number: 658052-09-6
- ChemSpider: none
- UNII: WZ1025JPGR

Chemical and physical data
- Formula: C_{6748}H_{10408}N_{1800}O_{2092}S_{52}
- Molar mass: 151891.12 g·mol^{−1}

Mapatumumab (HGS-ETR1) is an experimental human monoclonal antibody undergoing clinical trials for the treatment of cancer. It targets TRAIL-R1, also known as DR4, which is expressed on the surface of many tumor cell types.

== Development history ==
This drug was discovered by Cambridge Antibody Technology, now AstraZeneca, and Human Genome Sciences, now GlaxoSmithKline, as a result of the collaboration between the two companies in 1999 in exploitation of CAT's phage display technology. Early work by the two companies indicated that mapatumumab induced cell death in multiple tumor types both in vitro and in vivo.

== Clinical trials ==
A phase 1 clinical trial in 2004 demonstrated the safety and tolerability of mapatumumab in cancer patients with advanced solid tumors or non-Hodgkin’s lymphoma, and supported further evaluation in phase 2 clinical trials, both as a single agent and in combination with chemotherapy. In a phase 2 clinical trial, mapatumumab was well tolerated and could be administered safely in patients with advanced non-small-cell lung cancer (NSCLC) and advanced colorectal cancer. Stable disease was observed in a number of NSCLC patients. In two phase 1b clinical trials mapatumumab in combination with chemotherapy was well tolerated by patients with advanced solid tumors. Partial response was observed in a number of patients in each of the studies. The results of a phase 2 clinical trial demonstrated that mapatumumab was well tolerated and capable of producing clinical responses when administered as monotherapy in patients with advanced non-Hodgkin’s lymphoma, according to HGS.

=== Multiple myeloma ===
In 2008 HGS reported initial results of a randomised phase 2 trial of mapatumumab in combination with bortezomib in advanced multiple myeloma. However, in 2010, mapatumumab failed in a midstage study. There was no difference in disease response or progression-free survival rates between patients receiving the drug for multiple myeloma and the control group.

=== Non-small-cell lung cancer ===
"In August 2008, ... initial dosing of patients in a randomized Phase 2 trial of HGS-ETR1 (10 mg/kg or 30 mg/kg) in combination with paclitaxel and carboplatin as first-line therapy in patients with advanced non-small-cell lung cancer (NSCLC); initial data from the study are anticipated in 2009."

=== Liver cancer ===
"In July 2008, HGS initiated dosing in ... a randomized Phase 2 trial of HGS-ETR1 in combination with Nexavar (sorafenib) in patients with advanced hepatocellular cancer, which accounts for 80-90% of all liver cancers."

== See also ==
- Lexatumumab
