= Lnx =

Lnx or LNX may refer to:

- $\operatorname{ln}(x)$, the natural logarithm function
- LNX1, a human enzyme
- Smolensk North Airport (IATA code), Russia
- Lil Nas X, American rapper and singer
