= STK16 =

Protein-coding gene in the species Homo sapiens

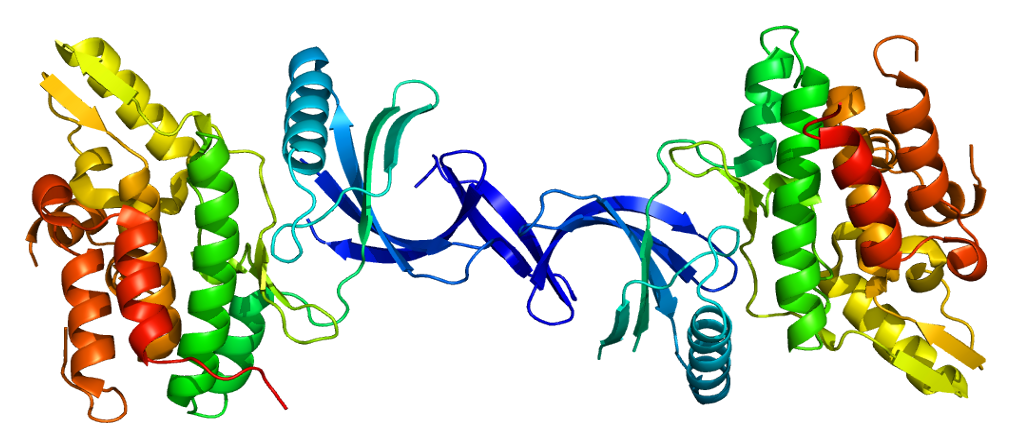
Available structures
| PDB | Ortholog search: PDBe RCSB |
| PDB | List of PDB id codes 2BUJ |

Identifiers
- Aliases: STK16, KRCT, MPSK, PKL12, TSF1, serine/threonine kinase 16, PSK, hPSK
- External IDs: OMIM: 604719; MGI: 1313271; HomoloGene: 2739; GeneCards: STK16; OMA:STK16 - orthologs
- EC number: 2.7.10.2

Gene location (Human)
| Chr. | Chromosome 2 (human) |
| Band | 2q35 | Start | 219,245,455 bp |
| Band | 2q35 | End | 219,250,337 bp |

Gene location (Mouse)
| Chr. | Chromosome 1 (mouse) |
| Band | 1|1 C4 | Start | 75,187,482 bp |
| Band | 1|1 C4 | End | 75,192,250 bp |
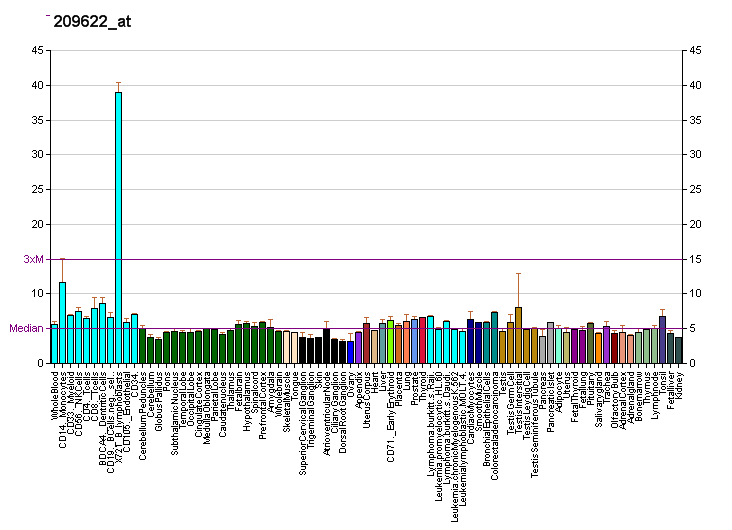
RNA expression pattern
| Bgee | Human / Mouse (ortholog); Top expressed in: mucosa of transverse colon; body of pancreas; right lobe of liver; right adrenal cortex; islet of Langerhans; olfactory zone of nasal mucosa; granulocyte; stromal cell of endometrium; body of stomach; left adrenal cortex / Top expressed in: right kidney; granulocyte; neural layer of retina; ventricular zone; superior frontal gyrus; spermatocyte; dentate gyrus of hippocampal formation granule cell; yolk sac; proximal tubule; primary visual cortex; More reference expression data |
| BioGPS | More reference expression data |
Gene ontology
| Molecular function | transferase activity; protein kinase activity; nucleotide binding; DNA-binding transcription activator activity, RNA polymerase II-specific; non-membrane spanning protein tyrosine kinase activity; protein binding; ATP binding; kinase activity; protein serine/threonine kinase activity |
| Cellular component | Golgi-associated vesicle; perinuclear region of cytoplasm; membrane; cytoplasm; cytosol |
| Biological process | protein autophosphorylation; peptidyl-tyrosine phosphorylation; protein phosphorylation; transcription by RNA polymerase II; phosphorylation; positive regulation of transcription by RNA polymerase II; cellular response to transforming growth factor beta stimulus |
Sources:Amigo / QuickGO
Orthologs
| Species | Human | Mouse |
| Entrez | 8576 | 20872 |
| Ensembl | ENSG00000115661 | ENSMUSG00000026201 |
| UniProt | O75716 | O88697 |
| RefSeq (mRNA) | NM_001008910; NM_003691; NM_032768; NM_001330213; NM_001330214 NM_001330215 | NM_001277992; NM_011494 |
| RefSeq (protein) | NP_001008910; NP_001317142; NP_001317143; NP_001317144 | NP_001264921; NP_035624 |
| Location (UCSC) | Chr 2: 219.25 – 219.25 Mb | Chr 1: 75.19 – 75.19 Mb |
| PubMed search |
- Wikidata
| View/Edit Human | View/Edit Mouse |

Serine/threonine-protein kinase 16 is an enzyme that in humans is encoded by the STK16 gene.

== Interactions ==
STK16 has been shown to interact with NAGK.
