= Darapladib =

Chemical compound

Clinical data
- Other names: SB-480848
- Routes of administration: By mouth
- ATC code: None

Legal status
- Legal status: Investigational

Identifiers
- IUPAC name: N-(2-Diethylaminoethyl)-2-[2-[(4-fluorophenyl)methylsulfanyl]-4-oxo-6,7-dihydro-5H-cyclopenta[d]pyrimidin-1-yl]-N-[[4-[4-(trifluoromethyl)phenyl]phenyl]methyl]acetamide
- CAS Number: 356057-34-6
- PubChem CID: 9939609
- IUPHAR/BPS: 6696
- ChemSpider: 8115230
- UNII: UI1U1MYH09
- KEGG: D03650
- ChEMBL: ChEMBL204021
- PDB ligand: 5HV (PDBe, RCSB PDB)
- CompTox Dashboard (EPA): DTXSID70189073
- ECHA InfoCard: 100.130.738

Chemical and physical data
- Formula: C_{36}H_{38}F_{4}N_{4}O_{2}S
- Molar mass: 666.78 g·mol^{−1}
- 3D model (JSmol): Interactive image
- SMILES: FC(F)(F)c1ccc(cc1)c2ccc(cc2)CN(C(=O)CN\4C(\SCc3ccc(F)cc3)=N/C(=O)/C5=C/4CCC5)CCN(CC)CC
- InChI: InChI=1S/C36H38F4N4O2S/c1-3-42(4-2)20-21-43(22-25-8-12-27(13-9-25)28-14-16-29(17-15-28)36(38,39)40)33(45)23-44-32-7-5-6-31(32)34(46)41-35(44)47-24-26-10-18-30(37)19-11-26/h8-19H,3-7,20-24H2,1-2H3; Key:WDPFJWLDPVQCAJ-UHFFFAOYSA-N

Darapladib is an inhibitor of lipoprotein-associated phospholipase A2 (Lp-PLA_{2}) that is in development as a drug for treatment of atherosclerosis.

It was discovered by Human Genome Sciences in collaboration with GlaxoSmithKline (GSK).

In November 2013, GSK announced that the drug had failed to meet Phase III endpoints in a trial of 16,000 patients with acute coronary syndrome (ACS). An additional trial of 13,000 patients (SOLID-TIMI 52) finished in May 2014. The study failed to reduce the risk of coronary heart disease death, myocardial infarction, and urgent coronary revascularization compared with placebo in acute coronary syndrome patients treated with standard medical care.

In 2022, Darapladib has been found to inhibit intraerythrocytic growth of the malaria parasite Plasmodium falciparum by inhibition of the human host enzyme peroxiredoxin 6. The authors present data that the original target of Darapladib, Lp-PLA_{2}, is absent in the host red blood cell.
