= Samsung Biologics =

South Korean biotechnology company

Samsung Biologics Co., Ltd.
- Type: Public
- Traded as: KRX: 207940
- Industry: Biopharmaceuticals
- Founded: 2011; 15 years ago
- Headquarters: Songdo, Incheon, South Korea
- Area served: Worldwide
- Key people: John Rim (president and CEO)
- Revenue: ▲KRW 4.55 trillion (2024)
- Operating income: ▲KRW 325.7 billion (2024)
- Owners: Samsung C&T (43.44%); Samsung Electronics (31.49%); National Pension Service (5.1%)
- Number of employees: 5,300 (2025)
- Subsidiaries: Samsung Bioepis
- Website: samsungbiologics.com

Samsung Biologics Co., Ltd. (Korean: 삼성바이오로직스) is a global contract development and manufacturing organization headquartered in Songdo, Incheon, South Korea. The biotech division of Samsung Group, its core services range from late discovery to large-scale commercial manufacturing. The company focuses on monoclonal antibodies, bispecific antibodies, antibody-drug conjugates, and mRNA vaccines.

The company has partnered with pharmaceutical companies such as Pfizer, GlaxoSmithKline, Eli Lilly, AstraZeneca and Bristol-Myers Squibb.

== History ==
=== Facilities & Expansion ===
Founded in 2011, Samsung Biologics built four manufacturing plants between 2011 and 2023 with a combined capacity of 605,000 liters. In 2023, Samsung Biologics began construction of a fifth plant in Incheon, South Korea with a capacity of 180,000 liters. In March 2025, Samsung Biologics began operations at its dedicated antibody-drug conjugate (ADC) manufacturing facility in Songdo, expanding its service capabilities into ADC production. With the addition of Plant 5, the company holds a total manufacturing capacity of 785,000 liters.

Since 2020, Samsung Biologics has expanded its United States operations, opening offices in New Jersey and Boston to more closely support U.S. biopharmaceutical companies across both coasts. In 2025, Samsung Biologics also opened a regional office in Tokyo, Japan, to strengthen ties with Japanese pharmaceutical and biotechnology companies. In 2025, Samsung acquired the Human Genome Sciences drug production facilities based in Rockville, Maryland from GSK plc for $280 million to establish their first US production site.

In 2025, Samsung Biologics launched ExellenS™, a manufacturing framework based on the company's experience in plant design, digitalization, and operations. The framework standardizes equipment, processes, and functional specifications to facilitate technology transfers, regulatory approvals, and production outcomes. Samsung Biologics uses the ExellenS™ model to maintain consistency across its manufacturing operations.

=== Notable Partnerships ===
As of June 2024, Samsung Biologics' CEO John Rim reported active partnerships with 16 of the top 20 largest biopharmaceutical companies. This includes early deals with Roche and Bristol-Myers Squibb in 2013, through to large partnerships during and after the pandemic. In 2020, GSK and Samsung Biologics signed the first of two major agreements: a $231 million, eight-year deal to manufacture biological therapies, including the lupus drug Benlysta. Two years later, a second $296 million deal was signed.

During the COVID-19 pandemic, Samsung Biologics partnered with Moderna for fill-finish, packaging and labeling of its mRNA vaccine, Spikevax. The company was also contracted to manufacture Eli Lilly's COVID-19 antibody therapeutic and AstraZeneca's long-acting antibody therapeutic as part of a larger multi-product deal.

In June 2023, Samsung Biologics entered a partnership with Pfizer for the commercial manufacturing of Pfizer’s multi-product biosimilars portfolio in a deal worth $411 million. A month later, Samsung Biologics entered two deals with Pfizer worth a combined $897 million to produce biosimilar products ranging from oncology and inflammation to immunotherapy at its Plant 4.

Along with Big pharma partnerships, the company has engaged with smaller development-stage companies. In 2023, Samsung Biologics announced a multi-year agreement with European venture capital firm Kurma Partners to support its portfolio companies through development, manufacturing, and de-risking services. In February 2024, Samsung Biologics announced a partnership agreement with LigaChem (formerly LegoChem) Biosciences to provide antibody development and drug substance manufacturing services to support LigaChem's antibody-drug conjugate (ADC) pipeline.

Samsung Biologics signed a 1.7 trillion won ($1.2 billion) deal with an unnamed Asian pharmaceutical company to provide contract manufacturing organization services, the largest contract secured in the company's history.

=== Business Ventures ===
In 2012, it established Samsung Bioepis, a biosimilar medicine developer, as a joint venture with Biogen. The company acquired full ownership of Samsung Bioepis in 2022 by purchasing all remaining shares from Biogen for $2.3 billion. Samsung Biologics completed its spin-off of Samsung Bioepis.

In 2021, the Samsung Life Science Fund was created through a joint partnership between Samsung Biologics, Samsung Bioepis, and Samsung C&T. The fund, managed by Samsung Ventures, aims to foster the growth of next-generation technologies, such as gene therapies and ADCs.

In July 2026, Samsung Biologics announced it would acquire Swiss peptide contract development and manufacturing organization (CDMO) PolyPeptide Group for approximately 1.46 billion Swiss francs, in what was described as the largest merger and acquisition in the history of South Korea's pharmaceutical and biotechnology industry. Samsung Biologics said it would acquire 100 percent of PolyPeptide Group's shares through a purchase of the majority shareholder's stake followed by a tender offer, with the acquisition expected to be completed by the end of December 2026.

=== Platforms ===
Samsung Biologics has developed a range of proprietary technologies for biologics development. This includes S-CHOice, a cell line expression technology introduced in 2020. In 2022, Samsung Biologics launched S-DUAL, a bispecific antibody platform, and its DEVELOPICK platform, a service that selects candidate materials for new drugs. Samsung Biologics has since expanded its technology portfolio with additional platforms, including S-CHOsient, S-AfuCHO, S-Tensify, S-Glyn, S-OptiCharge, and S-HiCon.

=== Sustainability ===
Samsung Biologics published its first annual sustainability report in June 2021. It was added to the Dow Jones Sustainability World Index later that year. The company was awarded the Sustainable Market Initiative's 2022 Terra Carta Seal, which recognizes global companies driving innovation and action towards the creation of genuinely sustainable markets. In 2023, Samsung Biologics received both a leadership A− score from the Carbon Disclosure Project (CDP) and an EcoVadis Platinum Sustainability Rating.

Samsung Biologics participates in several global sustainability and responsible-business initiatives, including the Sustainable Markets Initiative (SMI), the Pharmaceutical Supply Chain Initiative (PSCI), the Task Force on Climate-related Financial Disclosures (TCFD), RE100, the United Nations Global Compact (UNGC), Sustainalytics assessments, and EcoVadis.

== Corporate governance ==
As of 30 June 2023.

Shareholder	Stake (%)	Flag
Samsung C&T	43.06%	South Korea
Samsung Electronics	31.22%	South Korea
National Pension Service	8.13%	South Korea

== Trade union ==
Samsung Biologics' union has 3,689 members, 75% of the company's workforce, as of March 2026. In March 2026, 95.52% of union members voted to strike, citing unfair labor practices, unauthorized use of employee personal data, and "deep structural concerns" with the company's ESG policies.

== See also ==
- List of pharmaceutical companies
