= TRAIL =

Mammalian protein

TNFSF10
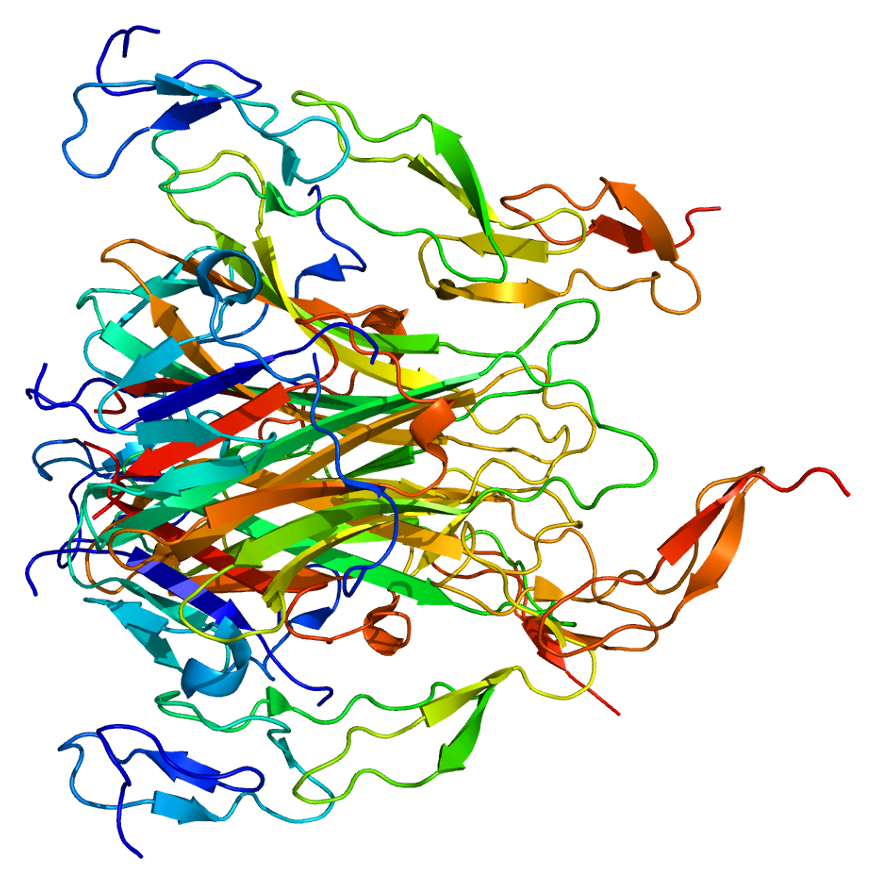

Identifiers
- Aliases: TNFSF10, APO2L, Apo-2L, CD253, TL2, TRAIL, TNLG6A, tumor necrosis factor superfamily member 10, TNF superfamily member 10
- External IDs: OMIM: 603598; MGI: 107414; GeneCards: TNFSF10
Available structures
PDB	Ortholog search: PDBe RCSB
PDB	List of PDB id codes 1D0G, 1D2Q, 1D4V, 1DG6, 1DU3, 4N90

Gene location (Human)
Chr.	Chromosome 3 (human)
Band	3q26.31	Start	172,505,508 bp
Band	3q26.31	End	172,523,475 bp

Gene location (Mouse)
Chr.	Chromosome 3 (mouse)
Band	3|3 A3	Start	27,371,177 bp
Band	3|3 A3	End	27,396,576 bp
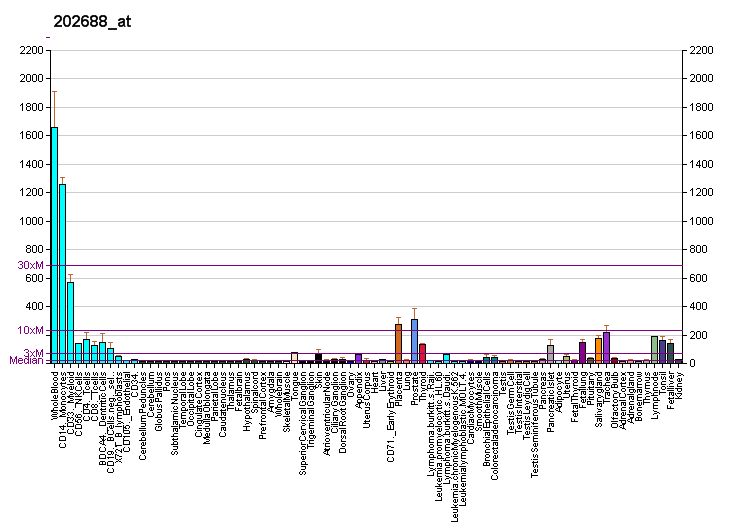

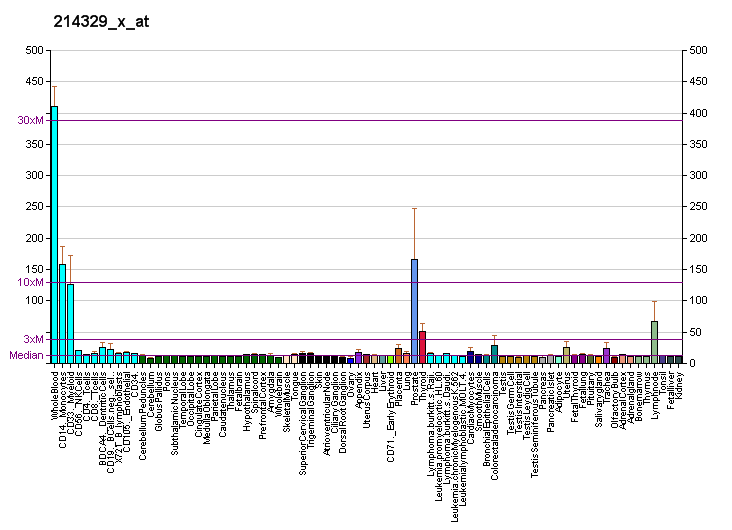

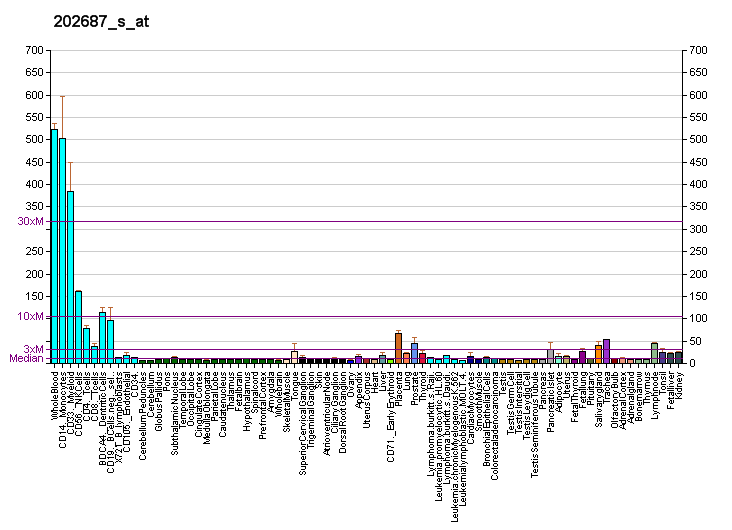
RNA expression pattern
Bgee	Human / Mouse (ortholog); Top expressed in: nasal epithelium; urethra; monocyte; bronchial epithelial cell; jejunal mucosa; palpebral conjunctiva; renal medulla; rectum; lower lobe of lung; human penis / Top expressed in: conjunctival fornix; mesenteric lymph nodes; right kidney; right lung lobe; submandibular gland; proximal tubule; lumbar subsegment of spinal cord; duodenum; jejunum; ileum; More reference expression data
BioGPS	More reference expression data
Gene ontology
Molecular function	cytokine activity; metal ion binding; protein binding; tumor necrosis factor receptor superfamily binding; tumor necrosis factor receptor binding; signaling receptor binding; zinc ion binding; identical protein binding; TRAIL binding
Cellular component	integral component of membrane; membrane; integral component of plasma membrane; extracellular region; extracellular exosome; extracellular space; plasma membrane
Biological process	activation of cysteine-type endopeptidase activity involved in apoptotic signaling pathway; cell-cell signaling; cell surface receptor signaling pathway; positive regulation of cysteine-type endopeptidase activity involved in apoptotic process; immune response; positive regulation of I-kappaB kinase/NF-kappaB signaling; positive regulation of release of cytochrome c from mitochondria; positive regulation of extrinsic apoptotic signaling pathway; regulation of extrinsic apoptotic signaling pathway via death domain receptors; activation of cysteine-type endopeptidase activity involved in apoptotic process; signal transduction; apoptotic process; negative regulation of extrinsic apoptotic signaling pathway via death domain receptors; positive regulation of apoptotic process; male gonad development; response to insulin; regulation of signaling receptor activity
Sources:Amigo / QuickGO
Orthologs
Databases	NCBI: entry; OMA: entry
Species	Human	Mouse
Entrez	8743	22035
Ensembl	ENSG00000121858	ENSMUSG00000039304
UniProt	P50591	P50592
RefSeq (mRNA)	NM_001190942; NM_001190943; NM_003810	NM_009425
RefSeq (protein)	NP_001177871; NP_001177872; NP_003801	NP_033451
Location (UCSC)	Chr 3: 172.51 – 172.52 Mb	Chr 3: 27.37 – 27.4 Mb
PubMed search
- Wikidata
View/Edit Human	View/Edit Mouse

TNF-related apoptosis-inducing ligand (TRAIL), is a protein functioning as a ligand that induces the process of cell death called apoptosis.

TRAIL is a cytokine that is produced and secreted by most normal tissue cells. It causes apoptosis primarily in tumor cells, by binding to certain death receptors. TRAIL and its receptors have been used as the targets of several anti-cancer therapeutics since the mid-1990s, such as Mapatumumab. However, as of 2013, these have not shown significant survival benefit. TRAIL has also been implicated as a pathogenic or protective factor in various pulmonary diseases, particularly pulmonary arterial hypertension.

TRAIL has also been designated CD253 (cluster of differentiation 253) and TNFSF10 (tumor necrosis factor (ligand) superfamily, member 10).

== Gene ==
In humans, the gene that encodes TRAIL is located at chromosome 3q26, which is not close to other TNF family members. The genomic structure of the TRAIL gene spans approximately 20 kb and is composed of five exonic segments 222, 138, 42, 106, and 1245 nucleotides and four introns of approximately 8.2, 3.2, 2.3 and 2.3 kb.

The TRAIL gene lacks TATA and CAAT boxes and the promoter region contains putative response elements for transcription factors GATA, AP-1, C/EBP, SP-1, OCT-1, AP3, PEA3, CF-1, and ISRE.

=== The TRAIL gene as a drug target ===
TIC10 (which causes expression of TRAIL) was investigated in mice with various tumour types.

Small molecule ONC201 causes expression of TRAIL which kills some cancer cells.

== Structure ==
TRAIL shows homology to other members of the tumor necrosis factor superfamily. It is composed of 281 amino acids and has characteristics of a type II transmembrane protein. The N-terminal cytoplasmic domain is not conserved across family members, however, the C-terminal extracellular domain is conserved and can be proteolytically cleaved from the cell surface. TRAIL forms a homotrimer that binds three receptor molecules.

== Function ==
TRAIL binds to the death receptors DR4 (TRAIL-RI) and DR5 (TRAIL-RII). The process of apoptosis is caspase-8-dependent. Caspase-8 activates downstream effector caspases including procaspase-3, -6, and -7, leading to activation of specific kinases. TRAIL also binds the receptors DcR1 and DcR2, which do not contain a cytoplasmic domain (DcR1) or contain a truncated death domain (DcR2). DcR1 functions as a TRAIL-neutralizing decoy-receptor. The cytoplasmic domain of DcR2 is functional and activates NFkappaB. In cells expressing DcR2, TRAIL binding therefore activates NFkappaB, leading to transcription of genes known to antagonize the death signaling pathway and/or to promote inflammation. Application of engineered ligands that have variable affinity for different death (DR4 and DR5) and decoy receptors (DCR1 and DCR2) may allow selective targeting of cancer cells by controlling activation of Type 1/Type 2 pathways of cell death and single cell fluctuations. Luminescent iridium complex-peptide hybrids, which mimic TRAIL, have recently been synthesized in vitro. These artificial TRAIL mimics bind to DR4/DR5 on cancer cells and induce cell death via both apoptosis and necrosis, which makes them a potential candidate for anticancer drug development.

== The TRAIL receptors as a drug target ==
In clinical trials only a small proportion of cancer patients responded to various drugs that targeted TRAIL death receptors. Many cancer cell lines develop resistance to TRAIL and limits the efficacy of TRAIL-based therapies.

== Interactions ==
TRAIL has been shown to interact with TNFRSF10B.

== See also ==
- The Proteolysis Map
