= Alan Walton =

American businessman

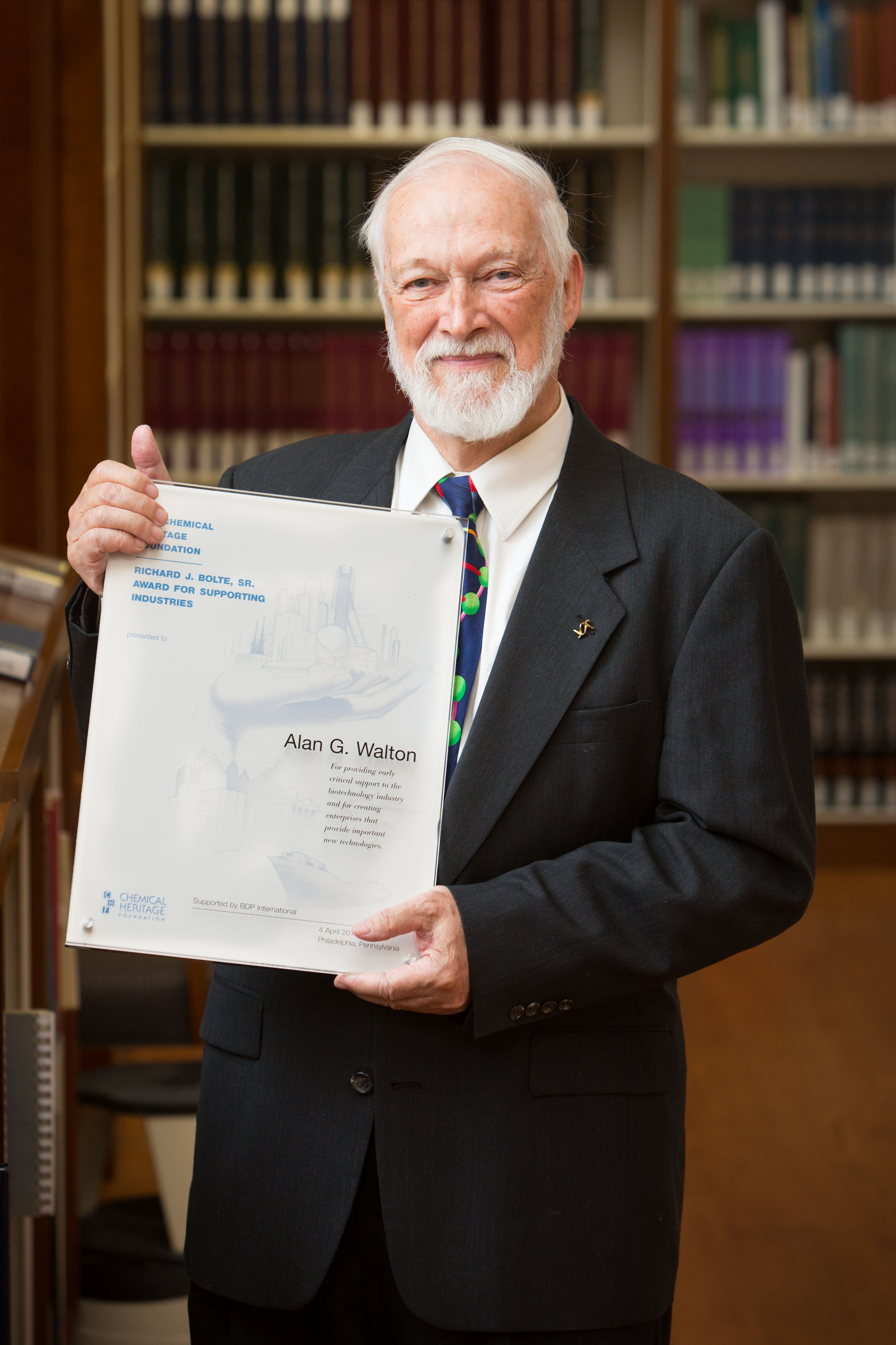
- Alan Walton, 2013
- Born: April 3, 1936; Kings Norton, Birmingham, England
- Died: July 4, 2015 (aged 79); Westport, Connecticut, U.S.
- Citizenship: American
- Awards: 2013 Richard J. Bolte Sr., Award for Supporting Industries
- Scientific career
- Fields: Chemistry

Alan G. Walton OBE (April 3, 1936 – July 4, 2015) was a scientist, businessman, and venture capitalist. He was born in England in 1936 and earned a Ph.D. from the University of Nottingham. He worked for twenty years as a professor at Case Western Reserve University and later served as the Chairman of Oxford Bioscience Corporation. Walton was instrumental in the development and funding of the Human Genome Project. Through his association with Oxford Bioscience, Walton managed over $850 million in a portfolio that included 80 companies. In 2012, he was appointed as an officer of the Order of the British Empire by Queen Elizabeth II. He died in 2015 at his home in Westport, Connecticut.

== Early life, family, and education ==
Alan George Walton was born April 3, 1936, in Kings Norton, Birmingham, England. Growing up in wartime Britain, Walton's earliest memories were of the Blitz and the wartime privations common to British people at the time. He attended Kings Norton Boys Grammar School, where he developed his first interest in the subject of chemistry. He later enrolled at the University of Nottingham, earning a B.S. in Chemistry. Walton played in a rock band during his time at Nottingham, but was forced to give it up to pay more attention to his studies. He also served in the Royal Air Force Volunteer Reserve while at school, where he learned to fly a DHC-1 Chipmunk. Walton went on to earn a Ph.D. in physical chemistry in 1960, also from Nottingham.

While in school, Walton married Jasmin Christensen in 1958. They had two children, Kimm and Keir, and remained married until her death in 1970. In 1972 he married archaeologist Nancy White of Cleveland, Ohio, but they soon divorced. In 1977, he married E.J. Egolf and adopted her two children Kristin and Sherri. They remained married for the rest of Walton's life. He died in 2015 at his home in Westport, Connecticut at the age of 79.

== Academic career and awards ==
After finishing his doctoral program, Walton moved to the United States where he initially taught and did postdoctoral research at the University of Indiana. In 1961, he was hired as an assistant professor at the Case Institute of Technology in Cleveland, Ohio, where he remained until 1981. In 1967, Case merged with the Western Reserve University to become Case Western Reserve University. For a part of Walton's time there, from 1971 to 1973, he was a visiting professor of biological chemistry at Harvard Medical School. While teaching, he earned a further degree, a D.Sc. in biological chemistry, from Nottingham in 1973.

At Case Western, Walton served as Professor of Macromolecular Science. Walton's early research at Case involved the formation of crystals, or nucleation. In 1966, he was promoted to associate professor and granted tenure; he became a full professor in 1971. The following year, in coordination with Helga Furedi-Milhofer, Walton became the director of a joint research project with the Ruđer Bošković Institute in Zagreb, Yugoslavia (present-day Croatia). The collaboration resulted in a book Walton co-wrote with Furedi-Milhofer, The Formation and Properties of Precipitates, published in 1979. One reviewer called the book "a readable and current introduction into the state of our knowledge concerning precipitate formation and properties." In all, Walton the author of over 120 scientific articles and ten books, focusing on aging, molecular hematology, biopolymers, epitaxy, gene splicing, new pro-drugs, as well as the molecular basis of various diseases.

He was also a member of President Jimmy Carter's Technology Transfer Committee from 1977 to 1981. Among the results of that committee's work was the Bayh–Dole Act of 1980, which allowed universities to commercially license technology arising from federal government-funded research.

In 1972, Walton was awarded the Israel State Medal Presented by Israel Academy of Science. Other awards followed, including the Sigma Chi Research Award For contributions to science (1974); the Rudjer Boskovic Institute Award Presented by Yugoslav Academy of Science (1979); and the Richard J. Bolte Sr. Award for supporting industries (2013). He was named an Honorary Distinguished Adjunct Professor Case Western Reserve University in 2007. In 2012, Walton was appointed an as officer of the Order of the British Empire (OBE) for "services to the UK biotechnology industry."

Walton's research resulted in two patents. The first, for chondroitin drug complexes, was granted in 1984 to Walton, Randall V. Sparer, and Nnochiro Ekwuribe. It involves "a novel class of pro drugs in which the drug substance is bonded ionically or covalently to a glycosaminoglycan of the class of the chondroitins, and to the use of such prodrugs in the treatment of animal and human patients." Walton's second patent, granted in 1987, was for bioactive compositions affecting human skin tissue.

== Business career ==
Walton's first foray into the business world was a part-time job running Biopolymer Corporation, a company he founded while still at Case Western in 1978. The company manufactured and sold biopolymers, and employed many of the post-doc and grad students that Walton knew from his teaching career.

In 1981, Walton moved from academics to business full-time to found one of the first biotechnology companies, University Genetics. The company was founded to enhance and commercialize university-based inventions and had exclusive licenses to patent or sell all inventions from 12 major universities and non-exclusives with 71. In an interview with The New York Times, Walton said "My new company addresses the problem—raising money from the public sector and funding research at universities. Then if ideas are developed useful to industrial users, we take a fee along the way. The job will give me a chance to keep in contact with industries all over the world." In 1983, the company went public and in 1986 it completed a secondary offering in which the original investors were bought out for $3.6 million, giving them a sixty-fold return on investment in five years. During Walton's tenure as CEO, the company’s focus shifted to funding start-up companies and working with venture capital firms. In that time, he was co-author of several treatises on the companies active in the biotechnology field, their strategies and relative success and failures (biotechnology Yearbook, Elsevier, 1983, 1985, 1986–1987) which led to his consulting with several venture capital firms. One firm he helped launch developed docosahexaenoic acid (DHA), an important component of baby formula.

Walton left University Genetics in 1987 to join venture capitalist firm Oxford Bioscience Partners. According to the firm, Walton was probably the first former tenured professor of molecular biology in the venture capital industry, which then was mainly run by businesspeople with little bio-technical understanding. Walton's strategy was to finance new, university-based technologies with strong patent positions and make them the centerpiece of new companies. Companies financed by Oxford included Martek Biosciences Corporation, Geron Corporation, Exelixis, and Gene Finder, among others. In 1992, Walton, Wally Steinberg, and Craig Venter founded Human Genome Sciences (HGS), a company that bought the assets of Gene Finder and sought to use human DNA sequences to develop protein and antibody drugs. Around the same time, Walton helped Venter set up The Institute for Genome Research, a non-profit the discoveries of which were marketed by HGS. HGS went public the next year and the stock was heavily subscribed.

== Adventurer ==
Walton was an adventurous traveler. He also climbed Mount Kilimanjaro in 1989, sky dived at the North Pole in 2004, bungee jumped off the Bloukrans Bridge near Cape Town, South Africa in 2009, HALO jumped from 29,600 feet, and was a member of the first team of people to skydive over Mount Everest. Walton also continued to fly small planes, drawing on the training he gained in the Royal Air Force Volunteer Reserve. He was one of the first 100 people to pay for a trip into space through Virgin Galactic in 2004; after years of delays in getting the project off the ground, Walton was forced to ask for a refund in 2011, citing his advanced age.

== Sources ==
Books

- Venter, J. Craig (2007). A Life Decoded: My Genome: My Life. New York, New York: Penguin. ISBN 978-0670063581.
- Walton, Alan G.; Furedi, Helga (1967). The Formation and Properties of Precipitates. Huntington, New York: Robert E. Krieger. OCLC 799693407.
- Walton, Alan G. (2000). Beneath this Gruff Exterior There Beats a Heart of Plastic. Naperville, Illinois: Oak Hill Publishing. ISBN 1-891743-02-3.

Journals

- Howick, Lester C. (1967). "Book reviews – The formation and properties of precipitates". Analytical Chemistry. 39 (14): 80A–81A. doi:10.1021/ac50157a012.

Websites

- "Management, Board of Directors". Avalon Pharmaceuticals. Archived from the original on 2007-08-08.
- "Alan G. Walton: Scientist, Venture Capitalist & Adventurer" (PDF). Oxford Bioscience Partners.
- "England & Wales, Civil Registration Marriage Index, 1916–2005". Ancestry.com. General Register Office. 2010.
- "Ohio, Marriage Abstracts, 1970, 1972–2007". Ancestry.com. Ohio Department of Health, Office of Vital Statistics. 2010.

Newspapers

- Fowler, Elizabeth M. (June 24, 1981). "Molecular Biology and Business". The New York Times.
- "University Genetics". Hartford Courant. May 8, 1986. p. D7.
- "Human Genome's stock soars". Baltimore Sun. December 3, 1993. p. 18D.
- "Dream of Space Travel Over for Businessman". Leader-Telegram. Eau Claire, Wisconsin. October 9, 2011. p. 6D.
- "Alan G. Walton, 79". Westport Now. Westport, Connecticut. July 7, 2015.
