= PAFAH1B1 =

Protein-coding gene in the species Homo sapiens

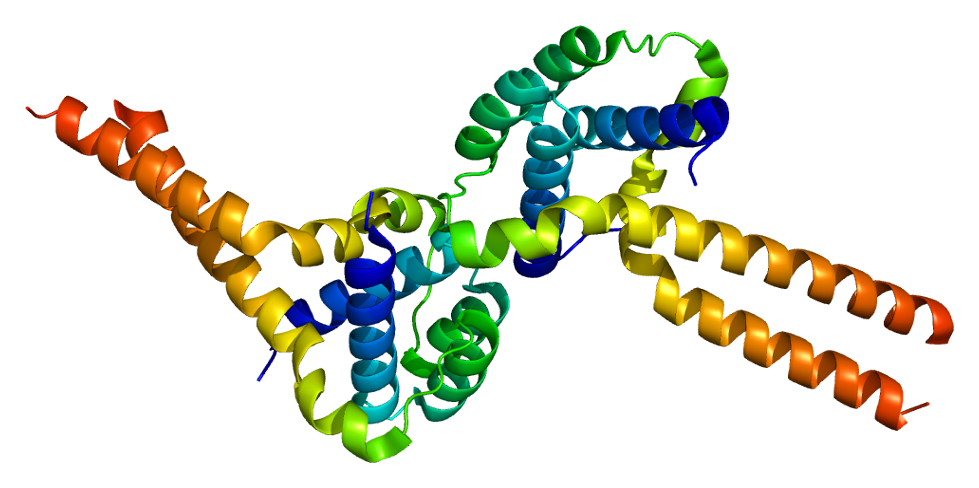

Identifiers
- Aliases: PAFAH1B1, LIS1, LIS2, MDCR, MDS, PAFAH, platelet-activating factor acetylhydrolase 1b, regulatory subunit 1 (45kDa), NudF, platelet activating factor acetylhydrolase 1b regulatory subunit 1
- External IDs: OMIM: 601545; MGI: 109520; GeneCards: PAFAH1B1
Available structures
PDB	Ortholog search: PDBe RCSB
PDB	List of PDB id codes 1UUJ, 1VYH

Gene location (Human)
Chr.	Chromosome 17 (human)
Band	17p13.3	Start	2,593,210 bp
Band	17p13.3	End	2,685,615 bp

Gene location (Mouse)
Chr.	Chromosome 11 (mouse)
Band	11 B5|11 45.76 cM	Start	74,564,775 bp
Band	11 B5|11 45.76 cM	End	74,615,496 bp
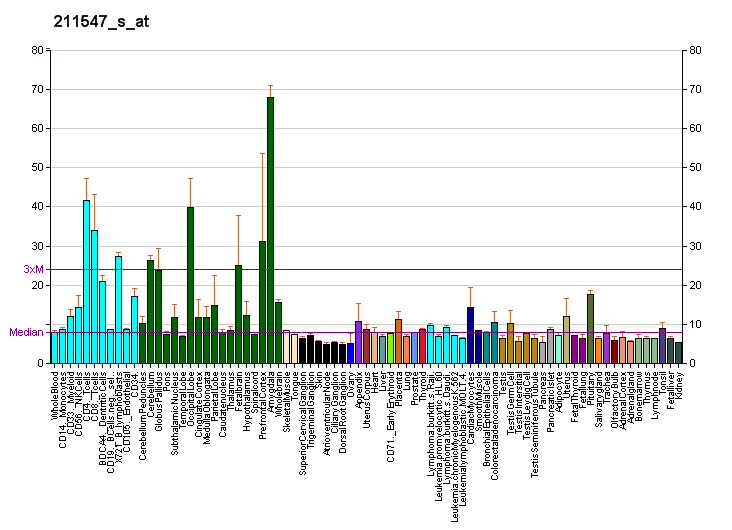
RNA expression pattern
Bgee	Human / Mouse (ortholog); Top expressed in: sperm; middle temporal gyrus; left testis; right testis; cerebellar vermis; frontal pole; pons; paraflocculus of cerebellum; orbitofrontal cortex; lateral nuclear group of thalamus / Top expressed in: seminiferous tubule; dentate gyrus of hippocampal formation granule cell; primary visual cortex; superior frontal gyrus; CA3 field; cingulate gyrus; substantia nigra; cerebellar cortex; perirhinal cortex; entorhinal cortex; More reference expression data
BioGPS	More reference expression data
Gene ontology
Molecular function	heparin binding; phospholipase binding; dynactin binding; protein-containing complex binding; protein homodimerization activity; protein binding; dynein intermediate chain binding; microtubule binding; phosphoprotein binding; phospholipase A2 activity; dynein complex binding; microtubule plus-end binding
Cellular component	cytoplasm; cytosol; nuclear membrane; nuclear envelope; membrane; microtubule organizing center; perinuclear region of cytoplasm; neuron projection; microtubule; cytoskeleton; nucleus; kinetochore; centrosome; astral microtubule; microtubule associated complex; extracellular exosome; kinesin complex; microtubule cytoskeleton; growth cone; spindle; axon; soma; cell cortex; vesicle; cell leading edge; axon cytoplasm; motile cilium; stereocilium; central region of growth cone; cytoplasmic microtubule
Biological process	germ cell development; positive regulation of cytokine-mediated signaling pathway; neuromuscular process controlling balance; nuclear migration; microtubule cytoskeleton organization involved in establishment of planar polarity; G2/M transition of mitotic cell cycle; stem cell division; acrosome assembly; cell cycle; osteoclast development; positive regulation of embryonic development; microtubule organizing center organization; cochlea development; platelet activating factor metabolic process; regulation of GTPase activity; adult locomotory behavior; transmission of nerve impulse; regulation of microtubule cytoskeleton organization; positive regulation of cellular component organization; positive regulation of mitotic cell cycle; protein secretion; cortical microtubule organization; learning or memory; neuroblast proliferation; positive regulation of axon extension; auditory receptor cell development; brain morphogenesis; chemical synaptic transmission; retrograde axonal transport; cell differentiation; negative regulation of neuron projection development; neuron migration; nervous system development; cerebral cortex development; establishment of centrosome localization; ameboidal-type cell migration; positive regulation of dendritic spine morphogenesis; microtubule cytoskeleton organization; actin cytoskeleton organization; vesicle transport along microtubule; lipid metabolism; establishment of planar polarity of embryonic epithelium; cell division; multicellular organism development; lipid catabolic process; negative regulation of JNK cascade; brain development; layer formation in cerebral cortex; nuclear membrane disassembly; cerebral cortex neuron differentiation; corpus callosum morphogenesis; hippocampus development; cell migration; sister chromatid cohesion; establishment of mitotic spindle orientation; microtubule-based process; maintenance of centrosome location; ciliary basal body-plasma membrane docking; regulation of G2/M transition of mitotic cell cycle; transport; microtubule sliding
Sources:Amigo / QuickGO
Orthologs
Databases	NCBI: entry; OMA: entry
Species	Human	Mouse
Entrez	5048	18472
Ensembl	ENSG00000007168	ENSMUSG00000020745
UniProt	P43034	P63005
RefSeq (mRNA)	NM_000430	NM_013625
RefSeq (protein)	NP_000421	NP_038653
Location (UCSC)	Chr 17: 2.59 – 2.69 Mb	Chr 11: 74.56 – 74.62 Mb
PubMed search
- Wikidata
View/Edit Human	View/Edit Mouse

Platelet-activating factor acetylhydrolase IB subunit alpha or Lisencephaly protein-1 (LIS-1) is an enzyme that in humans is encoded by the PAFAH1B1 gene. The protein plays an important role in regulating the motor protein dynein.

== Function ==
PAFAH1B1 was identified as encoding a gene that when mutated or lost caused the lissencephaly associated with Miller–Dieker syndrome. PAFAH1B1 encodes the non-catalytic alpha subunit of the intracellular Ib isoform of platelet-activating factor acetylhydrolase, a heterotrimeric enzyme that specifically catalyzes the removal of the acetyl group at the sn-2 position of platelet-activating factor (identified as 1-O-alkyl-2-acetyl-sn-glyceryl-3-phosphorylcholine). Two other isoforms of intracellular platelet-activating factor acetylhydrolase exist: one composed of multiple subunits, the other, a single subunit. In addition, a single-subunit isoform of this enzyme is found in serum.

According to one study, PAFAH1B1 interacts with VLDL receptor activated by reelin.

== Genomics ==
The gene is located at chromosome 17p13.3 on the Watson (plus) strand. The gene is 91,953 bases in length and encodes a protein of 410 amino acids (predicted molecular weight 46.638 kilodaltons).

== Interactions ==
PAFAH1B1 has been shown to interact with DYNC1H1, CLIP1, NDEL1, NDE1, PAFAH1B3, PAFAH1B2, NUDC, TUBA1A and Doublecortin.

== See also ==
- platelet-activating factor
- PAFAH1B2
- PAFAH1B3
