= N-acetyl-D-glucosamine kinase =

Enzyme found in humans

NAGK

Identifiers
- Aliases: NAGK, Nagk, Gnk, HSA242910, N-acetylglucosamine kinase
- External IDs: OMIM: 606828; MGI: 1860418; GeneCards: NAGK
Available structures
PDB	Ortholog search: PDBe RCSB
PDB	List of PDB id codes 2CH5, 2CH6
Enzyme activity
EC #	BRENDA	ExPASy	KEGG	MetaCyc
2.7.1.59	↗	↗	↗	↗
2.7.1.60	↗	↗	↗	↗

Gene location (Human)
Chr.	Chromosome 2 (human)
Band	2p13.3	Start	71,064,344 bp
Band	2p13.3	End	71,079,808 bp

Gene location (Mouse)
Chr.	Chromosome 6 (mouse)
Band	6|6 C3	Start	83,771,964 bp
Band	6|6 C3	End	83,781,000 bp
RNA expression pattern
Bgee	Human / Mouse (ortholog); Top expressed in: monocyte; granulocyte; oral cavity; spleen; blood; stromal cell of endometrium; lymph node; gallbladder; tonsil; mucosa of pharynx / Top expressed in: spermatocyte; yolk sac; internal carotid artery; external carotid artery; right kidney; transitional epithelium of urinary bladder; stroma of bone marrow; saccule; proximal tubule; seminiferous tubule; More reference expression data
BioGPS	More reference expression data
Gene ontology
Molecular function	protein binding; kinase activity; ATP binding; nucleotide binding; transferase activity; N-acetylglucosamine kinase activity
Cellular component	extracellular exosome; cytosol
Biological process	phosphorylation; N-acetylmannosamine metabolic process; N-acetylneuraminate catabolic process; carbohydrate phosphorylation; UDP-N-acetylglucosamine biosynthetic process; N-acetylglucosamine metabolic process
Sources:Amigo / QuickGO
Orthologs
Databases	NCBI: entry; OMA: entry
Species	Human	Mouse
Entrez	55577	56174
Ensembl	ENSG00000124357	ENSMUSG00000034744
UniProt	Q9UJ70	Q9QZ08
RefSeq (mRNA)	NM_017567; NM_001330425; NM_001330426; NM_001365466	NM_001164187; NM_019542; NM_001347315
RefSeq (protein)	NP_001317354; NP_001317355; NP_060037; NP_001352395	NP_001157659; NP_001334244; NP_062415
Location (UCSC)	Chr 2: 71.06 – 71.08 Mb	Chr 6: 83.77 – 83.78 Mb
PubMed search
- Wikidata
View/Edit Human	View/Edit Mouse

N-acetyl-D-glucosamine kinase is an enzyme that in humans is encoded by the NAGK gene.

== Function ==
N-acetylglucosamine kinase (NAGK; EC 2.7.1.59) converts endogenous N-acetylglucosamine (GlcNAc), a major component of complex carbohydrates, from lysosomal degradation or nutritional sources into GlcNAc 6-phosphate. NAGK belongs to the group of N-acetylhexosamine kinases and is a prominent salvage enzyme of amino sugar metabolism in mammals.[supplied by OMIM]

== Interactions ==
NAGK has been shown to interact with STK16 and LNX1.
