= PAFAH2 =

Protein-coding gene in humans

Identifiers
- Aliases: PAFAH2, HSD-PLA2, platelet activating factor acetylhydrolase 2
- External IDs: OMIM: 602344; MGI: 2140321; GeneCards: PAFAH2
Enzyme activity
EC #	BRENDA	ExPASy	KEGG	MetaCyc
2.3.1.149	↗	↗	↗	↗
3.1.1.47	↗	↗	↗	↗

Gene location (Human)
Chr.	Chromosome 1 (human)
Band	1p36.11	Start	25,959,767 bp
Band	1p36.11	End	25,998,117 bp

Gene location (Mouse)
Chr.	Chromosome 4 (mouse)
Band	4|4 D2.3	Start	134,123,631 bp
Band	4|4 D2.3	End	134,154,724 bp
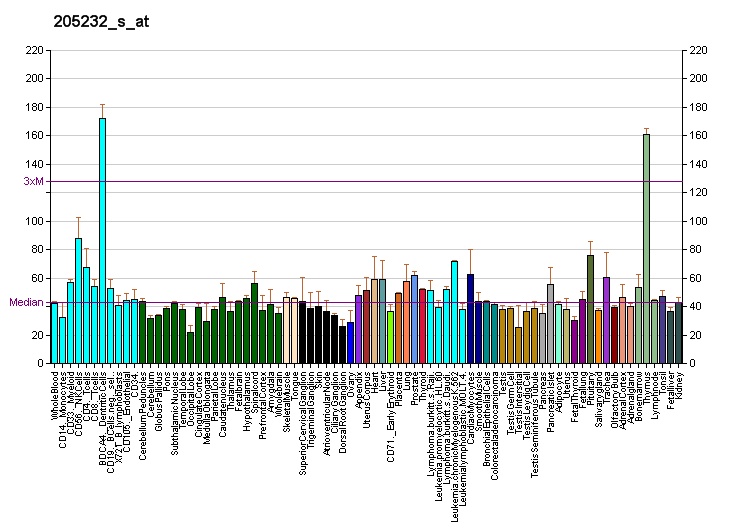

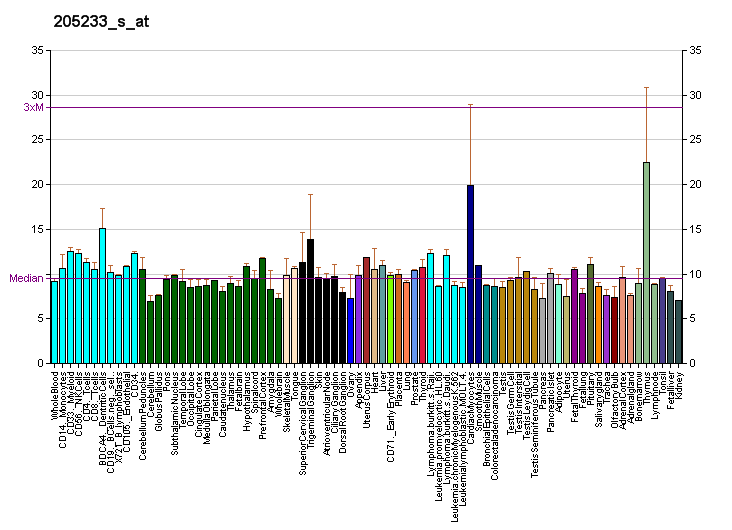
RNA expression pattern
Bgee	Human / Mouse (ortholog); Top expressed in: body of pancreas; epithelium of colon; granulocyte; islet of Langerhans; rectum; thymus; mucosa of transverse colon; gastrocnemius muscle; gonad; muscle of thigh / Top expressed in: left lobe of liver; epithelium of stomach; human kidney; migratory enteric neural crest cell; lacrimal gland; right kidney; proximal tubule; Paneth cell; transitional epithelium of urinary bladder; Epithelium of choroid plexus; More reference expression data
BioGPS	More reference expression data
Gene ontology
Molecular function	phospholipid binding; hydrolase activity; 1-alkyl-2-acetylglycerophosphocholine esterase activity
Cellular component	cytoplasm; endoplasmic reticulum; endoplasmic reticulum membrane; membrane
Biological process	lipid catabolic process; negative regulation of apoptotic process; lipid metabolism; blood coagulation
Sources:Amigo / QuickGO
Orthologs
Databases	NCBI: entry; OMA: entry
Species	Human	Mouse
Entrez	5051	100163
Ensembl	ENSG00000158006	ENSMUSG00000037366
UniProt	Q99487; Q5SY00	Q8VDG7
RefSeq (mRNA)	NM_000437	NM_001285872; NM_001285874; NM_001285875; NM_001285877; NM_133880
RefSeq (protein)	NP_000428	NP_001272801; NP_001272803; NP_001272804; NP_001272806; NP_598641
Location (UCSC)	Chr 1: 25.96 – 26 Mb	Chr 4: 134.12 – 134.15 Mb
PubMed search
- Wikidata
View/Edit Human	View/Edit Mouse

Platelet-activating factor acetylhydrolase 2, cytoplasmic is an enzyme that in humans is encoded by the PAFAH2 gene. It is one of several PAF acetylhydrolases.

== Function ==
This gene encodes platelet-activating factor acetylhydrolase isoform 2, a single-subunit intracellular enzyme that catalyzes the removal of the acetyl group at the SN-2 position of platelet-activating factor (identified as 1-O-alkyl-2-acetyl-sn-glyceryl-3-phosphorylcholine). However, this lipase exhibits a broader substrate specificity than simply platelet activating factor. Two other isoforms of intracellular platelet-activating factor acetylhydrolase exist, and both are multi-subunit enzymes. Additionally, there is a single-subunit serum isoform of this enzyme.
