= Lipoprotein-associated phospholipase A2 =

Protein-coding gene in the species Homo sapiens

PLA2G7
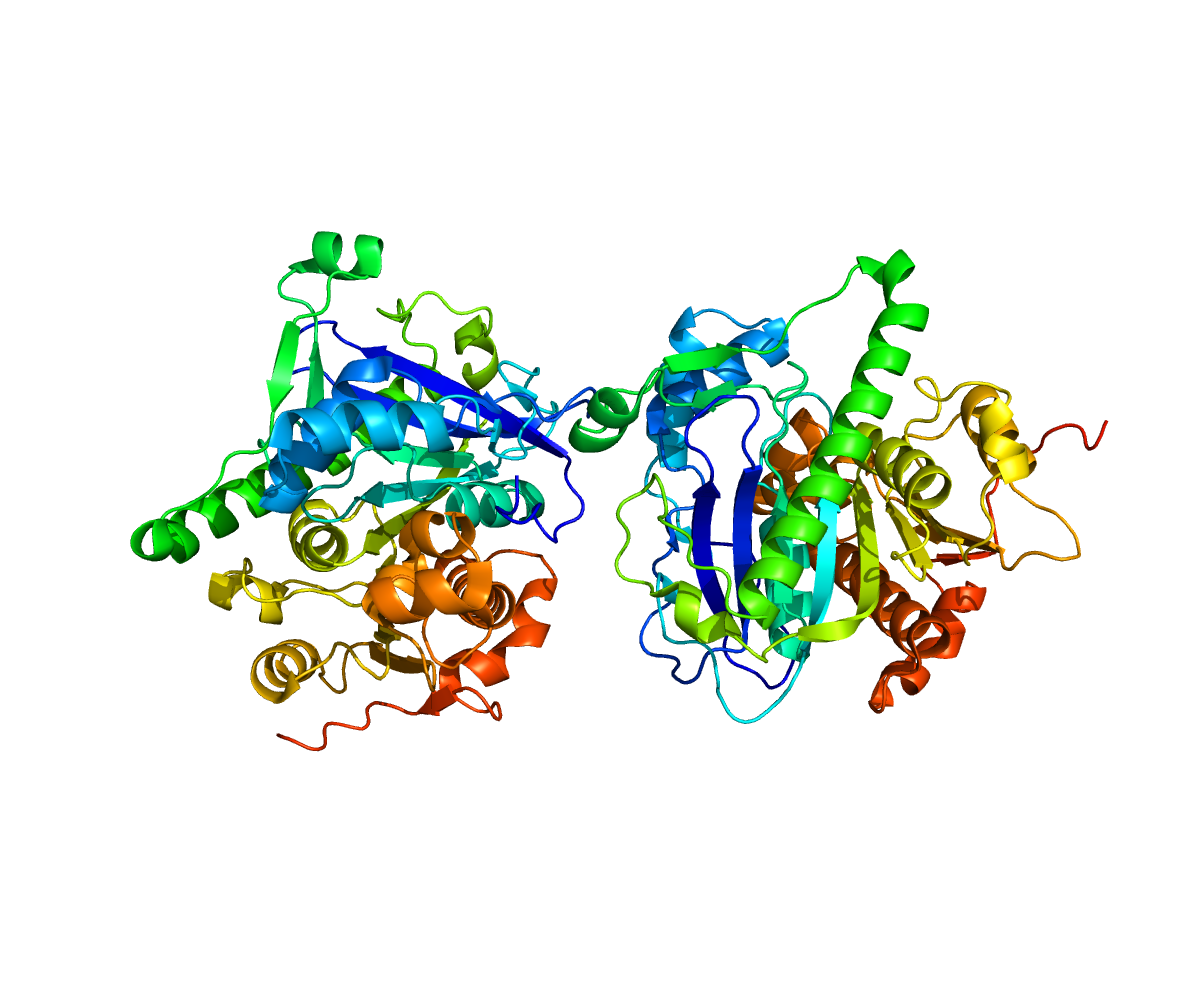
Available structures
PDB	Ortholog search: PDBe RCSB
PDB	List of PDB id codes 3D59, 3D5E, 3F96, 3F97, 3F98, 3F9C, 5JAU, 5JAR, 5I9I, 5JAD, 5JAO, 5I8P, 5JAS, 5JAN, 5JAL, 5JAH, 5JAP, 5JAT

Identifiers
- Aliases: PLA2G7, LDL-PLA2, LP-PLA2, PAFAD, PAFAH, Lipoprotein-associated phospholipase A2, phospholipase A2 group VII
- External IDs: OMIM: 601690; MGI: 1351327; HomoloGene: 3725; GeneCards: PLA2G7; OMA:PLA2G7 - orthologs

Gene location (Human)
Chr.	Chromosome 6 (human)
Band	6p12.3	Start	46,704,201 bp
Band	6p12.3	End	46,735,693 bp

Gene location (Mouse)
Chr.	Chromosome 17 (mouse)
Band	17|17 B3	Start	43,878,989 bp
Band	17|17 B3	End	43,923,092 bp
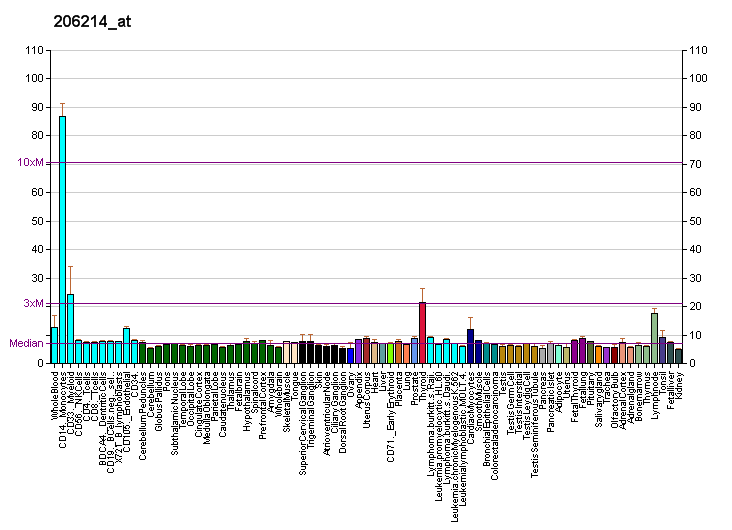
RNA expression pattern
Bgee	Human / Mouse (ortholog); Top expressed in: amniotic fluid; decidua; appendix; monocyte; lymph node; spleen; mucosa of sigmoid colon; rectum; endometrium; palpebral conjunctiva / Top expressed in: stroma of bone marrow; deep cerebellar nuclei; medial vestibular nucleus; lobe of cerebellum; cerebellar vermis; dorsal tegmental nucleus; stria vascularis; pontine nuclei; vestibular sensory epithelium; globus pallidus; More reference expression data
BioGPS	More reference expression data
Gene ontology
Molecular function	calcium-independent phospholipase A2 activity; hydrolase activity; phospholipid binding; hydrolase activity, acting on ester bonds; 1-alkyl-2-acetylglycerophosphocholine esterase activity
Cellular component	cytoplasm; extracellular region; low-density lipoprotein particle; extracellular space
Biological process	lipid catabolic process; lipid oxidation; plasma lipoprotein particle oxidation; positive regulation of monocyte chemotaxis; positive regulation of inflammatory response; low-density lipoprotein particle remodeling; lipid metabolism; platelet activating factor metabolic process
Sources:Amigo / QuickGO
Orthologs
Species	Human	Mouse
Entrez	7941	27226
Ensembl	ENSG00000146070	ENSMUSG00000023913
UniProt	Q13093	Q60963
RefSeq (mRNA)	NM_001168357; NM_005084	NM_013737
RefSeq (protein)	NP_001161829; NP_005075	NP_038765
Location (UCSC)	Chr 6: 46.7 – 46.74 Mb	Chr 17: 43.88 – 43.92 Mb
PubMed search
- Wikidata
View/Edit Human	View/Edit Mouse

Lipoprotein-associated phospholipase A_{2} (Lp-PLA_{2}) also known as platelet-activating factor acetylhydrolase (PAF-AH) is a phospholipase A_{2} enzyme that in humans is encoded by the PLA2G7 gene. Lp-PLA_{2} is a 45-kDa protein of 441 amino acids. It is one of several PAF acetylhydrolases.

== Function ==
In the blood, Lp-PLA_{2} travels mainly with low-density lipoprotein (LDL). Less than 20% is associated with high-density lipoprotein (HDL). Several lines of evidence suggest that HDL-associated Lp-PLA_{2} may substantially contribute to the HDL antiatherogenic activities. It is an enzyme produced by inflammatory cells and hydrolyzes oxidized phospholipids in LDL.

Lp-PLA_{2} is platelet-activating factor (PAF) acetylhydrolase (EC 3.1.1.47), a secreted enzyme that catalyzes the degradation of PAF to inactive products by hydrolysis of the acetyl group at the sn-2 position, producing the biologically inactive products LYSO-PAF and acetate.

== Clinical significance ==
Lp-PLA_{2} is involved in the development of atherosclerosis, an observation that has prompted interest as a possible therapeutic target (see, e.g. the investigational drug Darapladib). In human atherosclerotic lesions, two main sources of Lp-PLA_{2} can be identified, including that which is brought into the intima bound to LDL (from the circulation), and that which is synthesized de novo by plaque inflammatory cells (macrophages, T cells, mast cells)."

It is used as a marker for cardiac disease.

A meta-analysis involving a total of 79,036 participants in 32 prospective studies found that Lp-PLA_{2} levels are positively correlated with increased risk of developing coronary heart disease and stroke.

== See also ==
- Darapladib
