= NUDC =

Protein-coding gene in humans

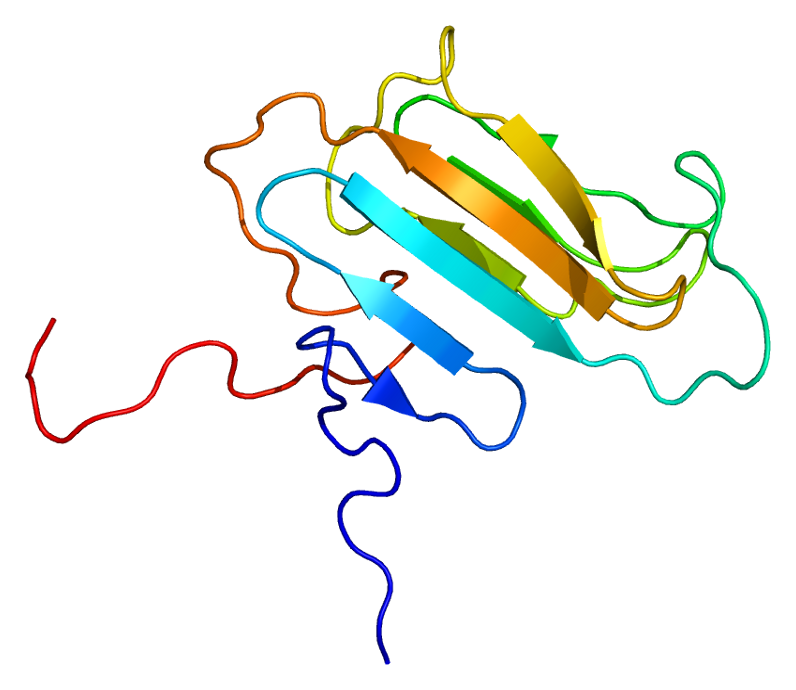

Identifiers
- Aliases: NUDC, HMNPD011, nudC nuclear distribution protein, nuclear distribution C, dynein complex regulator
- External IDs: OMIM: 610325; MGI: 106014; GeneCards: NUDC
Available structures
| PDB | Ortholog search: PDBe RCSB |
| PDB | List of PDB id codes 3QOR |

Gene location (Human)
| Chr. | Chromosome 1 (human) |
| Band | 1p36.11 | Start | 26,900,238 bp |
| Band | 1p36.11 | End | 26,946,871 bp |

Gene location (Mouse)
| Chr. | Chromosome 4 (mouse) |
| Band | 4|4 D2.3 | Start | 133,259,853 bp |
| Band | 4|4 D2.3 | End | 133,273,307 bp |
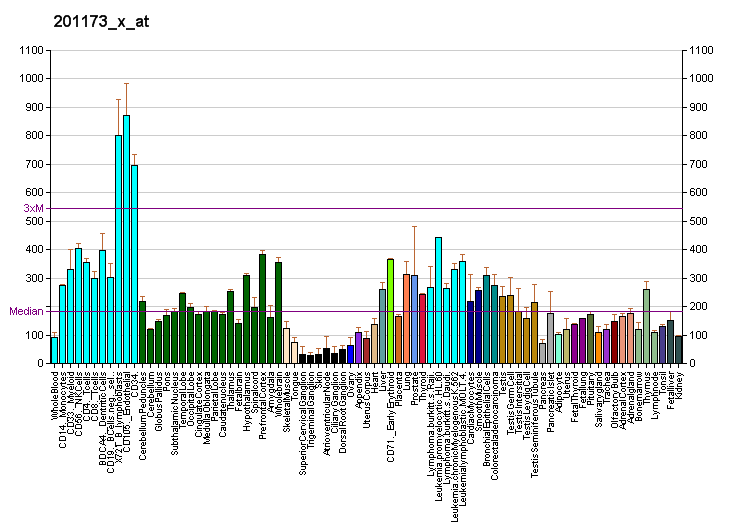

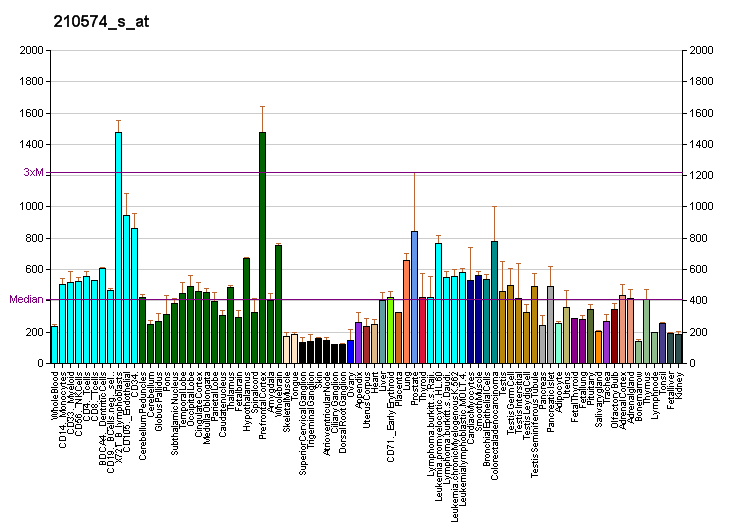
RNA expression pattern
| Bgee | Human / Mouse (ortholog); Top expressed in: tendon of biceps brachii; right uterine tube; right adrenal gland; right adrenal cortex; left adrenal gland; left adrenal cortex; right frontal lobe; anterior cingulate cortex; olfactory zone of nasal mucosa; internal globus pallidus / Top expressed in: yolk sac; embryo; embryo; dentate gyrus of hippocampal formation granule cell; ventricular zone; zygote; superior frontal gyrus; neural layer of retina; primary visual cortex; tail of embryo; More reference expression data |
| BioGPS | More reference expression data |
Gene ontology
| Molecular function | protein binding; cadherin binding; unfolded protein binding |
| Cellular component | cytoplasm; microtubule; cytoskeleton; nucleus; nucleoplasm; cytosol |
| Biological process | multicellular organism development; cell division; cell cycle; cell population proliferation; sister chromatid cohesion; protein folding; developmental process |
Sources:Amigo / QuickGO
Orthologs
| Databases | NCBI: entry; OMA: entry |
| Species | Human | Mouse |
| Entrez | 10726 | 18221 |
| Ensembl | ENSG00000090273 | ENSMUSG00000028851 |
| UniProt | Q9Y266 | O35685 |
| RefSeq (mRNA) | NM_006600 | NM_010948 |
| RefSeq (protein) | NP_006591 | NP_035078 |
| Location (UCSC) | Chr 1: 26.9 – 26.95 Mb | Chr 4: 133.26 – 133.27 Mb |
| PubMed search |
- Wikidata
| View/Edit Human | View/Edit Mouse |

Nuclear migration protein nudC is a protein that in humans is encoded by the NUDC gene.

== Interactions ==
NUDC has been shown to interact with PLK1 and PAFAH1B1.
