= PAFAH1B3 =

Protein-coding gene in the species Homo sapiens

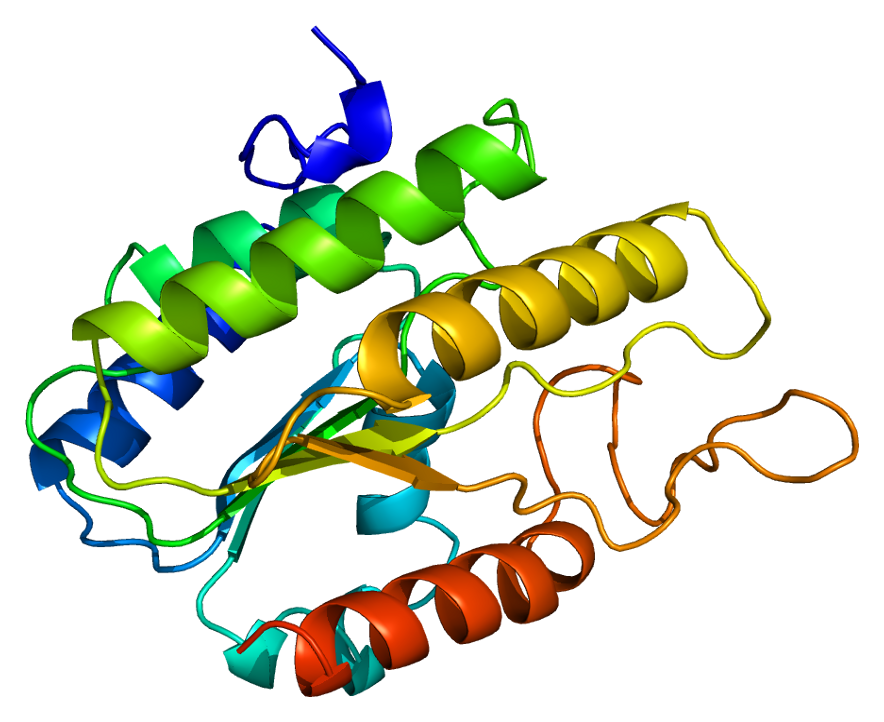

Identifiers
- Aliases: PAFAH1B3, PAFAHG, platelet activating factor acetylhydrolase 1b catalytic subunit 3
- External IDs: OMIM: 603074; MGI: 108414; HomoloGene: 1933; GeneCards: PAFAH1B3; OMA:PAFAH1B3 - orthologs

Gene location (Human)
| Chr. | Chromosome 19 (human) |
| Band | 19q13.2 | Start | 42,297,033 bp |
| Band | 19q13.2 | End | 42,303,546 bp |

Gene location (Mouse)
| Chr. | Chromosome 7 (mouse) |
| Band | 7|7 A3 | Start | 24,994,474 bp |
| Band | 7|7 A3 | End | 24,997,411 bp |
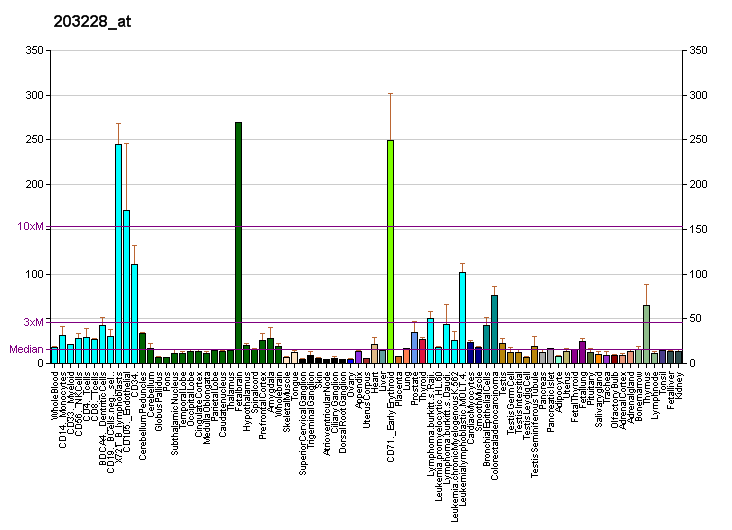
RNA expression pattern
| Bgee | Human / Mouse (ortholog); Top expressed in: ganglionic eminence; ventricular zone; gonad; right hemisphere of cerebellum; mucosa of transverse colon; nucleus accumbens; testicle; prefrontal cortex; right adrenal gland; amygdala / Top expressed in: medial ganglionic eminence; neural tube; ventricular zone; maxillary prominence; mandibular prominence; human fetus; efferent ductule; hand; abdominal wall; migratory enteric neural crest cell; More reference expression data |
| BioGPS | More reference expression data |
Gene ontology
| Molecular function | 1-alkyl-2-acetylglycerophosphocholine esterase activity; platelet-activating factor acetyltransferase activity; protein binding; hydrolase activity; identical protein binding; protein heterodimerization activity; phospholipase A2 activity |
| Cellular component | cytoplasm; extracellular exosome; membrane; cytosol |
| Biological process | lipid catabolic process; brain development; spermatogenesis; nervous system development; lipid metabolism |
Sources:Amigo / QuickGO
Orthologs
| Species | Human | Mouse |
| Entrez | 5050 | 18476 |
| Ensembl | ENSG00000079462 | ENSMUSG00000005447 |
| UniProt | Q15102 | Q61205 |
| RefSeq (mRNA) | NM_002573; NM_001145939; NM_001145940 | NM_008776; NM_001357350 |
| RefSeq (protein) | NP_001139411; NP_001139412; NP_002564 | NP_032802; NP_001344279 |
| Location (UCSC) | Chr 19: 42.3 – 42.3 Mb | Chr 7: 24.99 – 25 Mb |
| PubMed search |
- Wikidata
| View/Edit Human | View/Edit Mouse |

Platelet-activating factor acetylhydrolase IB subunit gamma is an enzyme that in humans is encoded by the PAFAH1B3 gene.

== Interactions ==
PAFAH1B3 has been shown to interact with PAFAH1B1 and LNX1.

== See also ==
- PAFAH1B1
- PAFAH1B2
