= LNX1 =

Protein-coding gene in the species Homo sapiens

Identifiers
- Aliases: LNX1, LNX, MPDZ, PDZRN2, ligand of numb-protein X 1
- External IDs: OMIM: 609732; MGI: 1278335; GeneCards: LNX1
Available structures
PDB	Ortholog search: PDBe RCSB
PDB	List of PDB id codes 3B76
Enzyme activity
EC #	BRENDA	ExPASy	KEGG	MetaCyc
2.3.2.27	↗	↗	↗	↗

Gene location (Human)
Chr.	Chromosome 4 (human)
Band	4q12	Start	53,459,301 bp
Band	4q12	End	53,701,405 bp

Gene location (Mouse)
Chr.	Chromosome 5 (mouse)
Band	5|5 C3.3	Start	74,753,108 bp
Band	5|5 C3.3	End	74,863,573 bp
RNA expression pattern
Bgee	Human / Mouse (ortholog); Top expressed in: middle temporal gyrus; parotid gland; Brodmann area 23; endothelial cell; Brodmann area 46; oral cavity; amniotic fluid; skin of arm; superior frontal gyrus; jejunal mucosa / Top expressed in: motor neuron; facial motor nucleus; substantia nigra; vestibular membrane of cochlear duct; Paneth cell; right ventricle; epithelium of stomach; lacrimal gland; transitional epithelium of urinary bladder; anterior horn of spinal cord; More reference expression data
BioGPS	n/a
Gene ontology
Molecular function	PDZ domain binding; protein binding; metal ion binding; ubiquitin-protein transferase activity; transferase activity; zinc ion binding
Cellular component	cytoplasm
Biological process	protein homooligomerization; protein ubiquitination; ubiquitin-dependent protein catabolic process
Sources:Amigo / QuickGO
Orthologs
Databases	NCBI: entry; OMA: entry
Species	Human	Mouse
Entrez	84708	16924
Ensembl	ENSG00000072201	ENSMUSG00000029228
UniProt	Q8TBB1	O70263
RefSeq (mRNA)	NM_001126328; NM_032622	NM_001159577; NM_001159578; NM_001159579; NM_001159580; NM_010727 NM_001359074
RefSeq (protein)	NP_001119800; NP_116011	NP_001153049; NP_001153050; NP_001153051; NP_001153052; NP_034857 NP_001346003
Location (UCSC)	Chr 4: 53.46 – 53.7 Mb	Chr 5: 74.75 – 74.86 Mb
PubMed search
- Wikidata
View/Edit Human	View/Edit Mouse

E3 ubiquitin-protein ligase LNX is an enzyme that in humans is encoded by the LNX1 gene.

== Interactions ==
LNX1 has been shown to interact with NAGK, NUMB and PAFAH1B3.
