= Lexatumumab =

Monoclonal antibody

Monoclonal antibody
- Type: Whole antibody
- Source: Human
- Target: TRAIL-R2

Clinical data
- ATC code: none

Identifiers
- CAS Number: 845816-02-6
- ChemSpider: none
- UNII: 967Q0SJD77
- KEGG: D06611

Chemical and physical data
- Formula: C_{6346}H_{9832}N_{1720}O_{2002}S_{42}
- Molar mass: 143601.02 g·mol^{−1}

Lexatumumab (also known as ETR2-ST01) is an experimental agonistic human monoclonal antibody against TRAIL-R2 (DR5, APO-2), intended for the treatment of cancer.

HGS-ETR2 antibodies were generated by Human Genome Sciences through a collaboration with Cambridge Antibody Technology.

Development was discontinued in 2015.
