= PAFAH1B2 =

Protein-coding gene in the species Homo sapiens

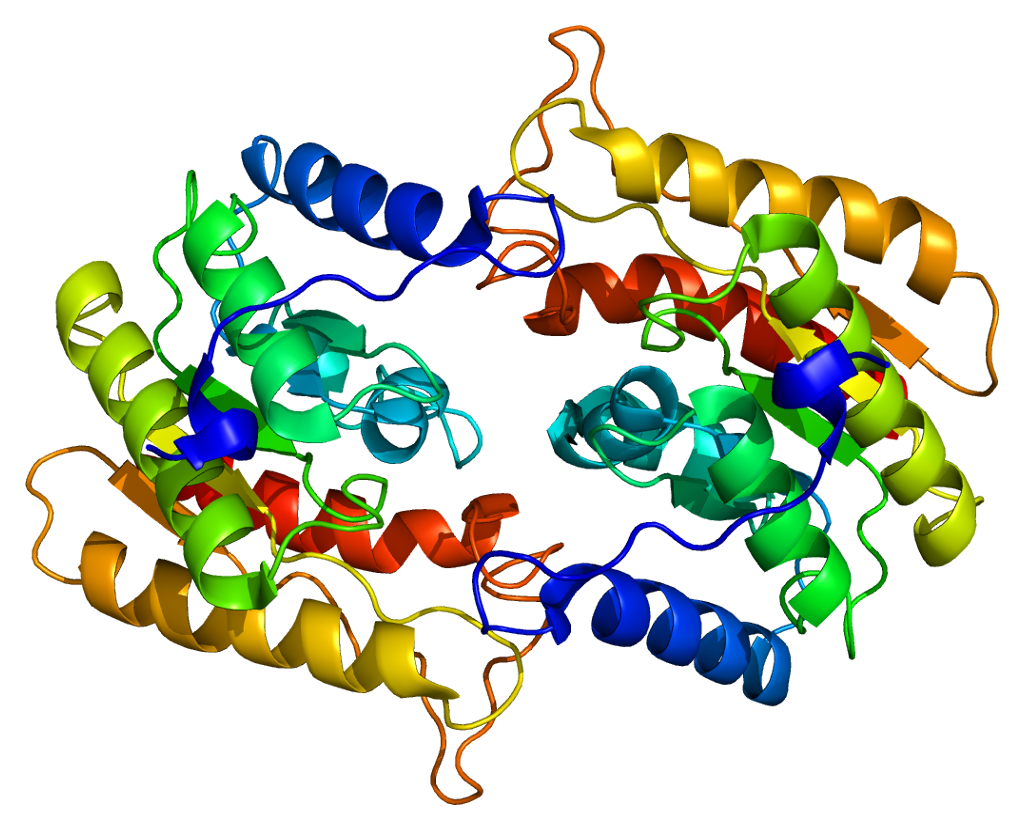
Available structures
PDB	Ortholog search: PDBe RCSB
PDB	List of PDB id codes 1VYH

Identifiers
- Aliases: PAFAH1B2, HEL-S-303, platelet activating factor acetylhydrolase 1b catalytic subunit 2
- External IDs: OMIM: 602508; MGI: 108415; HomoloGene: 1932; GeneCards: PAFAH1B2; OMA:PAFAH1B2 - orthologs

Gene location (Human)
Chr.	Chromosome 11 (human)
Band	11q23.3	Start	117,144,284 bp
Band	11q23.3	End	117,176,894 bp

Gene location (Mouse)
Chr.	Chromosome 9 (mouse)
Band	9|9 A5.2	Start	45,962,859 bp
Band	9|9 A5.2	End	46,012,690 bp
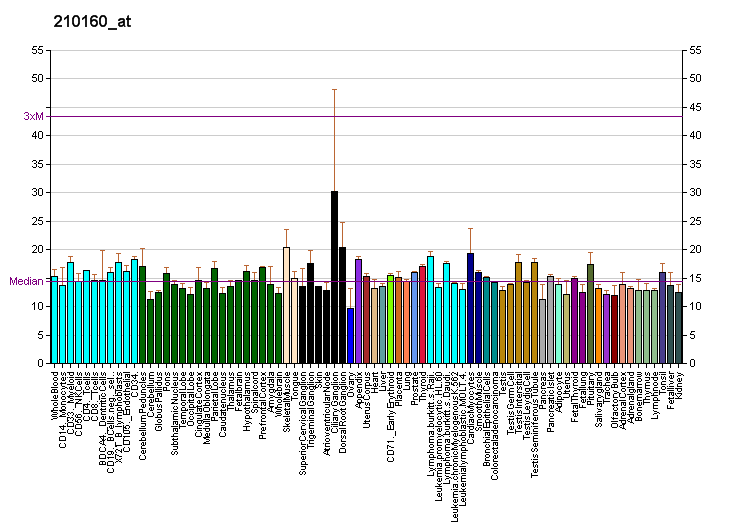
RNA expression pattern
Bgee	Human / Mouse (ortholog); Top expressed in: secondary oocyte; pons; inferior ganglion of vagus nerve; superior vestibular nucleus; trigeminal ganglion; pars reticulata; subthalamic nucleus; pars compacta; middle temporal gyrus; lateral nuclear group of thalamus / Top expressed in: spermatid; spermatocyte; tail of embryo; renal corpuscle; genital tubercle; mandibular prominence; neural tube; central gray substance of midbrain; somite; maxillary prominence; More reference expression data
BioGPS	More reference expression data
Gene ontology
Molecular function	1-alkyl-2-acetylglycerophosphocholine esterase activity; platelet-activating factor acetyltransferase activity; hydrolase activity; protein homodimerization activity; protein heterodimerization activity; phospholipase A2 activity; protein binding
Cellular component	plasma membrane; nucleolus; extracellular exosome; fibrillar center; extracellular region; cytoplasm; cytosol; secretory granule lumen; ficolin-1-rich granule lumen
Biological process	lipid catabolic process; positive regulation of macroautophagy; brain development; spermatogenesis; lipid metabolism; neutrophil degranulation
Sources:Amigo / QuickGO
Orthologs
Species	Human	Mouse
Entrez	5049	18475
Ensembl	ENSG00000168092	ENSMUSG00000003131
UniProt	P68402	Q61206
RefSeq (mRNA)	NM_001184746; NM_001184747; NM_001184748; NM_001309431; NM_002572	NM_008775
RefSeq (protein)	NP_001171675; NP_001171676; NP_001171677; NP_001296360; NP_002563	NP_032801; NP_001344167; NP_001344168; NP_001344169; NP_001344170 NP_001344172; NP_001344173; NP_001344174; NP_001344175
Location (UCSC)	Chr 11: 117.14 – 117.18 Mb	Chr 9: 45.96 – 46.01 Mb
PubMed search
- Wikidata
View/Edit Human	View/Edit Mouse

Platelet-activating factor acetylhydrolase IB subunit beta is an enzyme that in humans is encoded by the PAFAH1B2 gene.

== Interactions ==
PAFAH1B2 has been shown to interact with PAFAH1B1.

== See also ==
- PAFAH1B1
- PAFAH1B3
