= Human Genome Sciences =

American pharmaceutical company

- Industry: Healthcare, pharmaceuticals
- Founded: 1992
- Defunct: 2012
- Fate: Acquired by GlaxoSmithKline (2012) acquired by Samsung Biologics (2026)
- Headquarters: Rockville, Maryland, U.S.
- Key people: H. Thomas Watkins (CEO and President)
- Products: Diagnostic substances
- Number of employees: 1000
- Website: www.hgsi.com

Human Genome Sciences (HGS) was a biopharmaceutical corporation founded in 1992 by Craig Venter, Alan Walton and Wally Steinberg. It uses the human DNA sequence to develop protein and antibody drugs. It had drugs under development to treat such diseases as hepatitis C, systemic lupus erythmatosis, anthrax, and cancer. It collaborated with other biotechnology and pharmaceutical companies for development partnerships and licensing.

On July 16, 2012, HGS agreed to be purchased by GlaxoSmithKline for $3.6 billion. In 2025, Samsung Biologics acquired HGS from GSK for $280 million.

== History ==
The company was founded by Alan Walton, Wally Steinberg, and Craig Venter, who at the time founded the non-profit TIGR to begin sequencing and submitting patents on hundreds of thousands of protein-encoding DNA fragments. In 1992, Wally Steinberg hired William A. Haseltine as the first CEO of Human Genome Sciences, where he served as the founding chairman and chief executive officer for the first twelve years of the company.

In April 1993, SmithKline Beecham invested in Human Genome Sciences to acquire access to the new tools of genomic discovery. The initial $125 million transaction was the largest funding received by a fledgling biotechnology company. A year later, Human Genome Sciences and SmithKline Beecham split another $320 million raised by selling access to the Human Genome Sciences discovery tools to several other pharmaceutical companies, including the Japanese company Takeda, the German company Merck, the US company Schering Plough and the French Company Sanofi.

By the fall of 1994, the Institute of Genomic Research, working with Human Genome Sciences, had isolated and characterized by partial sequence analysis more than 90% of all human genes. Preliminary information regarding the tissue and cell in which they were expressed as messenger RNA was available, as data regarding their expression in normal and disease tissues. Over the next several years, Human Genome Sciences initiated clinical trials of several new drugs discovered using genomic methods. These included a new skin growth factor, Keratinocyte growth factor 2, for the treatment of diabetic ulcers and cancer therapy-induced mucositis, a vascular endothelial growth factor for the treatment of peripheral limb ischemia, radio-iodinated B Lymphocyte Stimulator (BLyS) for the treatment of multiple myeloma, a monoclonal antibody to treat cancer that recognizes the Trail receptor, and a monoclonal antibody that antagonizes BLyS (belimumab, trade name Benlysta).

In 1997, the company decided to build a $40 million drug production plant in Rockville.

In 2000, Haseltine said that the company's work "speeds up biological discovery a hundredfold, easily." He talked of finding in genes "the fountain of youth" in the form of "cellular replacement" therapies. More than $2 billion in investments was raised by the company by 1999-2000. Two initial drugs failed in clinical trials, and the stock share price declined from its highs. For example, in September 2000, the company reported that it had found a way to treat large, painful sores that often plague elderly patients using a protein spray called repifermin, made by a human gene called keratinocyte growth factor-2. In February 2004, the company said it was ending the development of repifermin because it showed no more benefit than a placebo in clinical trials.

In late 2004, HGS announced Haseltine's retirement and named H. Thomas Watkins the new President and CEO.

Benlysta (belimumab) received U.S. Food and Regulatory Administration approval for use in lupus in March 2011. Belimumab was being developed with GlaxoSmithKline, Abthrax (raxibacumab) for anthrax was the subject of a contract with the US Government under Project BioShield. Development of Albuferon (albinterferon) for Hepatitis C was discontinued after fatalities during early testing. Belimumab and raxibacumab were created as a result of a technology licensing deal signed with Cambridge Antibody Technology signed in 1999.

Its facilities in Rockville, Maryland earned its architect—Davis Carter Scott, Ltd.—an award from the National Association of Industrial and Office Properties. The association cited the glass walls, atrium, and uniform design of all the buildings as reasons for the award.

On April 19, 2012, GlaxoSmithKline (GSK) made a takeover bid for HGS, offering $13.00 per share for a total valuation of $2.59 billion. The HGS board "...in consultation with independent financial and legal advisors, has carefully reviewed and considered the GSK offer and has determined that the offer does not reflect the value inherent in HGS." Glaxo then tried to buy HGS shares on the open market, but the HGS board of directors adopted a "poison pill" shareholder rights plan that led Glaxo to back off. Shareholders sued the HGS board for adopting the plan. On July 16, 2012, HGS agreed to be purchased by GSK for $3.6 billion.

In 2025, Samsung Biologics acquired HGS and the two drug production sites in Rockville for $280 million. The acquisition established Samsung's first US based production site.

== Collaboration with Cambridge Antibody Technology ==
In 1999, HGS signed a deal with the UK biopharmaceutical company Cambridge Antibody Technology to discover and develop antibody therapeutics. This deal generated belimumab, raxibacumab, mapatumumab and lexatumumab. In April 2012, the first three of these products formed part of the six named by HGS in its public pipeline.

== Pipeline ==
As of April 2012, HGS's pipeline consisted of six products:

1. Benlysta
2. Raxibacumab
3. Darapladib
4. Albiglutide
5. Mapatumumab
6. HGS1036

== Bibliography ==
- The Disappointment Gene: Why genetics is so far a boondoggle, Slate Magazine, October 18, 2005
- Protein Spray Could Heal Sores, Wired News, September 13, 2000
- Human Genome's drug falls short, shares take a dip , September 26, 2003
- HGSI drops experimental drug, Washington Business Journal, February 2, 2004
- , HGS Press Release, January 7, 2008
- , HGS Press Release about GSK deal
- , HGS Press Release about Novartis
- , HGS Press release about Government Contract
