= DPH5 =

Protein-coding gene found in humans

Identifiers
- Aliases: DPH5, CGI-30, HSPC143, NPD015, AD-018, diphthamide biosynthesis 5
- External IDs: OMIM: 611075; MGI: 1916990; GeneCards: DPH5
Enzyme activity
EC #	BRENDA	ExPASy	KEGG	MetaCyc
2.1.1.314	↗	↗	↗	↗

Gene location (Human)
Chr.	Chromosome 1 (human)
Band	1p21.2	Start	100,989,623 bp
Band	1p21.2	End	101,026,088 bp

Gene location (Mouse)
Chr.	Chromosome 3 (mouse)
Band	3|3 G1	Start	115,887,837 bp
Band	3|3 G1	End	115,934,361 bp
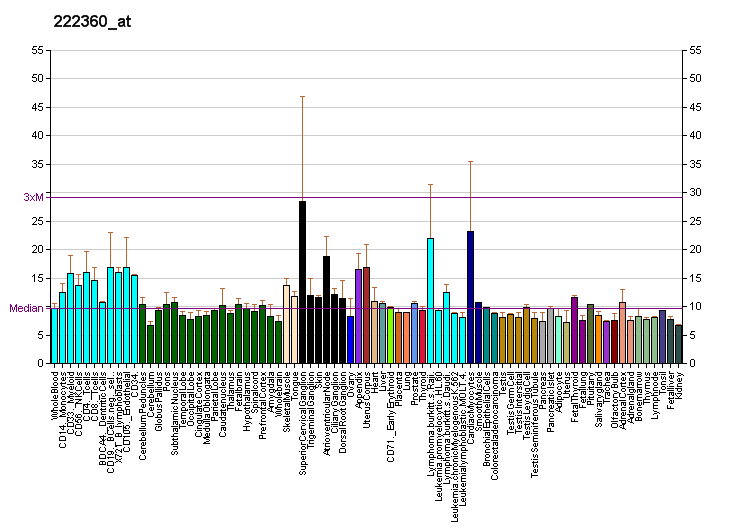

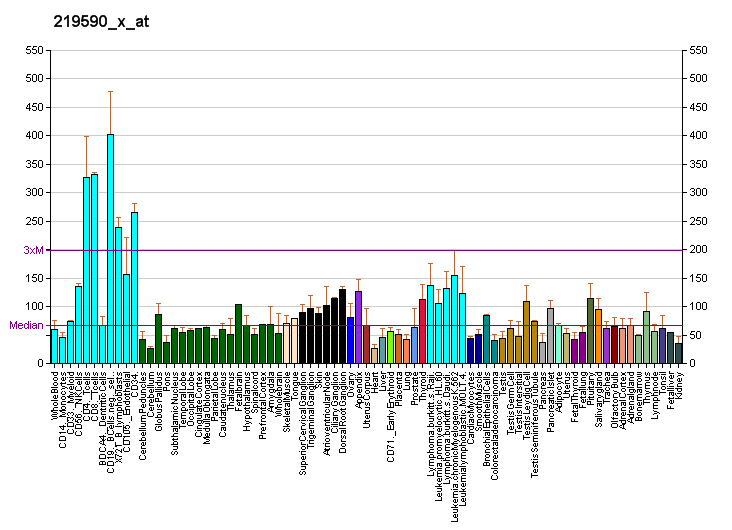
RNA expression pattern
Bgee	Human / Mouse (ortholog); Top expressed in: body of pancreas; gonad; left ovary; buccal mucosa cell; right adrenal gland; ganglionic eminence; right adrenal cortex; right ovary; tibialis anterior muscle; ventricular zone / Top expressed in: Paneth cell; yolk sac; primitive streak; endothelial cell of lymphatic vessel; motor neuron; fossa; blastocyst; Ileal epithelium; condyle; blastocyst; More reference expression data
BioGPS	More reference expression data
Gene ontology
Molecular function	methyltransferase activity; transferase activity; diphthine synthase activity
Cellular component	cytosol; cellular component
Biological process	methylation; metabolism; peptidyl-diphthamide biosynthetic process from peptidyl-histidine
Sources:Amigo / QuickGO
Orthologs
Databases	NCBI: entry; OMA: entry
Species	Human	Mouse
Entrez	51611	69740
Ensembl	ENSG00000117543	ENSMUSG00000033554
UniProt	Q9H2P9	Q9CWQ0
RefSeq (mRNA)	NM_001077394; NM_001077395; NM_015958	NM_027193
RefSeq (protein)	NP_001070862; NP_001070863; NP_057042	NP_081469
Location (UCSC)	Chr 1: 100.99 – 101.03 Mb	Chr 3: 115.89 – 115.93 Mb
PubMed search
- Wikidata
View/Edit Human	View/Edit Mouse

Diphthine synthase is an enzyme that in humans is encoded by the DPH5 gene.

This gene encodes a component of the diphthamide synthesis pathway. Diphthamide is a post-translationally modified histidine residue found only on translation elongation factor 2. It is conserved from archaebacteria to humans, and is targeted by diphtheria toxin and Pseudomonas exotoxin A to halt cellular protein synthesis.

The yeast and Chinese hamster homologs of this protein catalyze the trimethylation of the histidine residue on elongation factor 2, resulting in a diphthine moiety that is subsequently amidated to yield diphthamide. Multiple transcript variants encoding different isoforms have been found for this gene.
