= ADP-ribosyltransferase =

ADP-ribosyltransferase may refer to:

- NAD(P)(+)—protein-arginine ADP-ribosyltransferase, an enzyme
- NAD(+)—diphthamide ADP-ribosyltransferase, an enzyme
- Poly ADP ribose polymerase, an enzyme
