= DPH1 =

Protein-coding gene in the species Homo sapiens

Identifiers
- Aliases: DPH1, DPH2L, DPH2L1, OVCA1, DEDSSH, diphthamide biosynthesis 1
- External IDs: OMIM: 603527; MGI: 2151233; GeneCards: DPH1
Enzyme activity
EC #	BRENDA	ExPASy	KEGG	MetaCyc
2.5.1.108	↗	↗	↗	↗

Gene location (Human)
Chr.	Chromosome 17 (human)
Band	17p13.3	Start	2,030,137 bp
Band	17p13.3	End	2,043,898 bp

Gene location (Mouse)
Chr.	Chromosome 11 (mouse)
Band	11 B5|11 45.76 cM	Start	75,068,469 bp
Band	11 B5|11 45.76 cM	End	75,082,067 bp
RNA expression pattern
Bgee	Human / Mouse (ortholog); Top expressed in: pituitary gland; right hemisphere of cerebellum; anterior pituitary; right uterine tube; body of pancreas; right frontal lobe; left ovary; prostate; right ovary; left uterine tube / Top expressed in: proximal tubule; adrenal gland; epiblast; liver; spermatocyte; striatum of neuraxis; right kidney; dentate gyrus of hippocampal formation granule cell; urinary bladder; embryo; More reference expression data
BioGPS	n/a
Gene ontology
Molecular function	protein binding; transferase activity
Cellular component	cytoplasm; cytosol; nucleus; nucleoplasm; cell junction
Biological process	cell population proliferation; peptidyl-diphthamide biosynthetic process from peptidyl-histidine
Sources:Amigo / QuickGO
Orthologs
Databases	NCBI: entry; OMA: entry
Species	Human	Mouse
Entrez	1801	116905
Ensembl	ENSG00000108963	ENSMUSG00000078789
UniProt	Q9BZG8	Q5NCQ5
RefSeq (mRNA)	NM_001346574; NM_001346575; NM_001346576; NM_001383	NM_144491
RefSeq (protein)	NP_001333503; NP_001333504; NP_001333505; NP_001374	NP_652762
Location (UCSC)	Chr 17: 2.03 – 2.04 Mb	Chr 11: 75.07 – 75.08 Mb
PubMed search
- Wikidata
View/Edit Human	View/Edit Mouse

Diphthamide biosynthesis protein 1 is a protein that in humans is encoded by the DPH1 gene. It encodes a protein that performs posttranslational modification of histidine-715 on eukaryotic translation elongation factor 2 to diphthamide. This modification appears to be important in the translation of Cyclin D in ovarian cells. DPH1 is mutated in 90% of ovarian cancers end stage, usually by loss of heterozygosity.
