= NAD(+)—diphthamide ADP-ribosyltransferase =

Class of enzymes

NAD+-diphthamide ADP-ribosyltransferase

Identifiers
- EC no.: 2.4.2.36
- CAS no.: 52933-21-8

Databases
- IntEnz: IntEnz view
- BRENDA: BRENDA entry
- ExPASy: NiceZyme view
- KEGG: KEGG entry
- MetaCyc: metabolic pathway
- PRIAM: profile
- PDB structures: RCSB PDB PDBe PDBsum
- Gene Ontology: AmiGO / QuickGO
Search
- PMC: articles
- PubMed: articles
- NCBI: proteins

In enzymology, a NAD+-diphthamide ADP-ribosyltransferase (EC 2.4.2.36) is an enzyme that catalyzes the chemical reaction

NAD^{+} + peptide diphthamide $\rightleftharpoons$ nicotinamide + peptide N-(ADP-D-ribosyl)diphthamide

Thus, the two substrates of this enzyme are NAD^{+} and peptide diphthamide, whereas its two products are nicotinamide and peptide N-(ADP-D-ribosyl)diphthamide.

This enzyme belongs to the family of glycosyltransferases, to be specific, the pentosyltransferases. The systematic name of this enzyme class is NAD+:peptide-diphthamide N-(ADP-D-ribosyl)transferase. Other names in common use include ADP-ribosyltransferase, mono(ADPribosyl)transferase, and NAD-diphthamide ADP-ribosyltransferase.

== Structural studies ==
As of late 2007, 15 structures have been solved for this class of enzymes, with PDB accession codes 1S5B, 1S5C, 1S5D, 1S5E, 1S5F, 1SGK, 1TOX, 1XDT, 1XK9, 1ZM3, 1ZM4, 1ZM9, 2A5D, 2A5F, and 2A5G.

== Clinical significance ==
The extracellular ADP-ribosyl-transferase ART2 is expressed only on T cells. T cell activation of P2X_{7} receptors can activate the T cells or cause T cell differentiation, can affect T cell migration or (at high extracellular levels of NAD+) can induce cell death by ART2.

== See also ==
- Diphtheria toxin
- Pseudomonas exotoxin
- ADP-ribosylation
