= Constitutive ablation =

Constitutive ablation refers to gene expression which results in cell death. Constitutive cell ablation can be induced by diphtheria toxin (DT) in zebrafish.

== See also ==
- Genome
- Fatal/harmful mutations
