= M. Radhakrishna Pillai (scientist) =

Indian cancer biologist

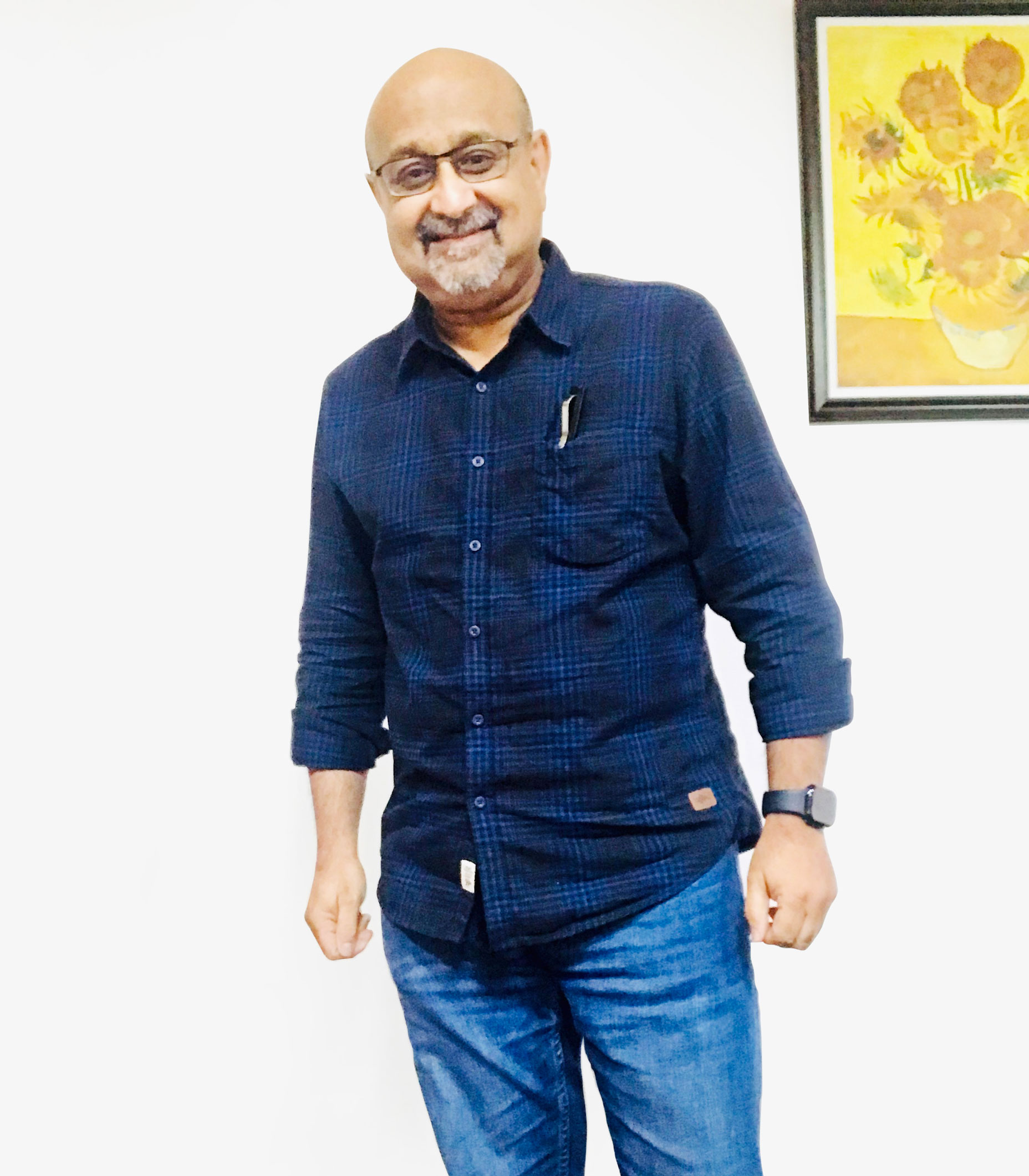
- Born: 18 August 1960 (age 66); Kerala, India
- Education: University of Kerala; University of Arizona
- Known for: Studies on papilloma viruses
- Awards: 1991 ICMR Raja Ravi Sher Singh Award; 2002 N-BIOS Prize
- Scientific career
- Fields: Cancer biology
- Workplaces: Regional Cancer Centre; Rajiv Gandhi Centre for Biotechnology

Madhavan Radhakrishna Pillai (born 18 August 1960) is an Indian cancer biologist and the former director of the Rajiv Gandhi Centre for Biotechnology. Known for his studies on papilloma viruses, Pillai is an elected fellow of the Indian Academy of Sciences, National Academy of Sciences, India, Royal College of Pathologists and the National Academy of Medical Sciences. The Department of Biotechnology of the Government of India awarded him the National Bioscience Award for Career Development, one of the highest Indian science awards, for his contributions to biosciences in 2002.

== Biography ==
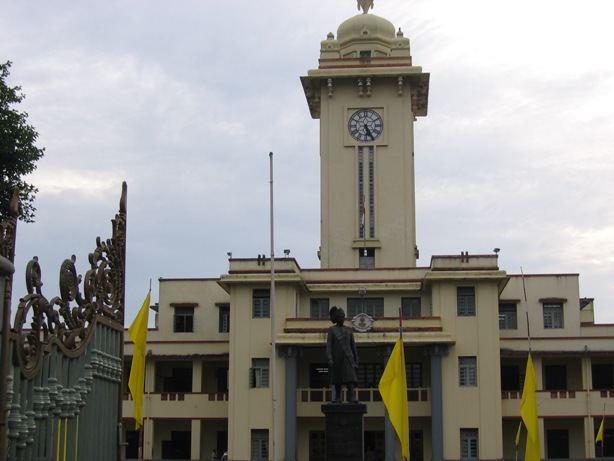
University of Kerala

Born on 18 August 1960 in the south Indian state of Kerala, Radhakrishna Pillai earned a PhD in tumor immunology from the University of Kerala and did his post-doctoral work in molecular biology and immunopharmacology at the University of Arizona. Returning to India, he joined the Regional Cancer Centre, Thiruvananthapuram in his home state where he served as the head of the Department of Molecular Medicine, Drug Development and Chemoinformatics. In 2005, when he was appointed as the director of Rajiv Gandhi Centre for Biotechnology (RGCB) at the age of 44, he became the youngest director of a national research institution in India, and he holds the post till date.

== Legacy ==
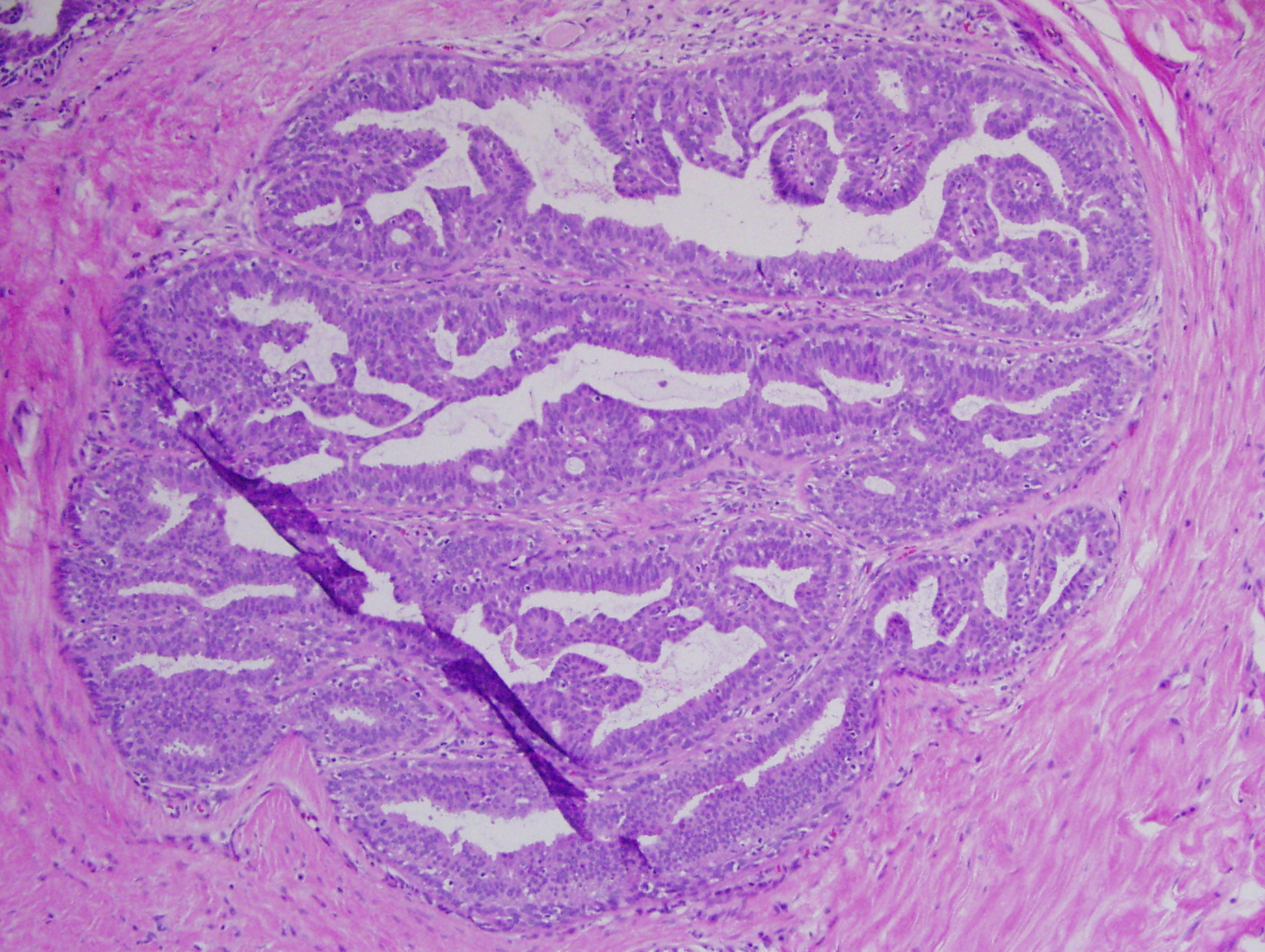
Intraductal papilloma of breast

Pillai chairs the Institutional Committee for Stem Cell Research of Sree Chitra Tirunal Institute for Medical Sciences and Technology and sits in the research advisory panels, scientific advisory councils or academic committees of the National Institute of Immunology, India, National Centre for Cell Science, Sree Chitra Tirunal Institute for Medical Sciences and Technology and Translational Health Science and Technology Institute. He is an executive committee member of the Kerala State Council for Science, Technology and Environment, an autonomous body established to promote technological development n the state by the Government of Kerala. He is also associated with other state government bodies such as Kerala Biotechnology Commission, Kerala Biotechnology Board and Kerala State Innovation Council as a member and with the University of Kerala as a member of its Senate, nominated by the vice-chancellor.

Pillai, a former president of the Society of Biotechnologists, India (SBC), is known to have worked on human papillomavirus as well as cervical cancer and is the coordinator of two programs of the Department of Biotechnology, namely National Cervical Cancer Control Program and Papillomavirus Vaccine Development Program. As the head of RGCB, he coordinated with Emory Vaccine Center of Emory University on a program of drug development for Influenza A virus subtype H1N1 and the initiative was successful in developing a peptide found in the skin mucus of Hydrophylax bahuvistara, a species of a frog common in the Western Ghats. The program continues its research on drug development for viral infections such as dengue and chikungunya. He has been one of the principal investigators of a program of the Department of Biotechnology for developing a mouthwash for oral mucositis based on various plant extracts for which patent is pending. He holds a patent for Novel porphyritic derivatives for photo dynamic therapy (PDT): A process for the preparation and thereof and their use as PDT agents and fluorescence probes for biological applications, a process jointly developed along with his colleagues at RGCB. Diseases like Oral dysplasia, oral leukoplakia, breast cancer, Human papillomavirus infection, oral carcinomas and swine fever and drug discoveries against these diseases are some of his other research interests. His studies have been documented by way of a number of articles (Note: Please see Selected bibliography section) and the online article repository of the Indian Academy of Sciences has listed 60 of them. Besides, he has edited one book, Mechanisms of Vascular Defects in Diabetes Mellitus and has contributed chapters to books published by others. He has also mentored several research scholars in their studies.

== Awards and honors ==
Pillai received the Raja Ravi Sher Singh Award of the Indian Council of Medical Research in 1991 for the research work done in connection with his doctoral studies. The Department of Biotechnology of the Government of India awarded him the National Bioscience Award for Career Development, one of the highest Indian science awards in 2002. Two years later, the Indian Academy of Sciences elected him as a fellow (2004) and the National Academy of Sciences, India made him their fellow the following year (2005). He is also a fellow of the National Academy of Medical Sciences and the Royal College of Pathologists. The award orations delivered by him include the 2000 edition of the Sandoz Oration of the Indian Council of Medical Research.

== Selected bibliography ==
=== Books ===
- C.C. Kartha; Surya Ramachandran; Radhakrishna M. Pillai (1 August 2017). Mechanisms of Vascular Defects in Diabetes Mellitus. Springer. ISBN 978-3-319-60324-7.

=== Chapters ===
- Perumana R. Sudhakaran (Ed.); T. R. Santhosh Kumar, M. Radhakrishna Pillai (Chapter authors) (25 October 2013). "Tumour Stem Cell Enrichment by Anticancer Drugs: A Potential Mechanism of Tumour Recurrence". Perspectives in Cancer Prevention-Translational Cancer Research. Springer Science & Business Media. pp. 9–. ISBN 978-81-322-1533-2.

=== Articles ===
- M Radhakrishna Pillai (2013). "Establishing and maintaining biobanks: experience of Rajiv Gandhi Centre for Biotechnology, (RGCB) Trivandrum". BMC Proceedings. 7 (suppl 5) (16): O16. doi:10.1186/1753-6561-7-S5-O16. PMC 3892675.
- Reshmi, G.; Radhakrishna Pillai, M. (2008). "Beyond HPV: oncomirs as new players in cervical cancer". FEBS Letters. 582 (30): 4113–4116. doi:10.1016/j.febslet.2008.11.011. PMID 19032954. S2CID 29106828.
- Hariharan, Ramkumar; Radhakrishna Pillai, M. (2006). "Homology modeling of the DNA-binding domain of human Smad5: a molecular model for inhibitor design". Journal of Molecular Graphics and Modelling. 24 (4): 271–277. doi:10.1016/j.jmgm.2005.09.009. PMID 16243555.

== See also ==
- Cancer immunology
- Immunopharmacology and Immunotoxicology
- Oncomir
- Mothers against decapentaplegic homolog 5
