= Diphtheria toxin =

Exotoxin

tox diphtheria toxin precursor
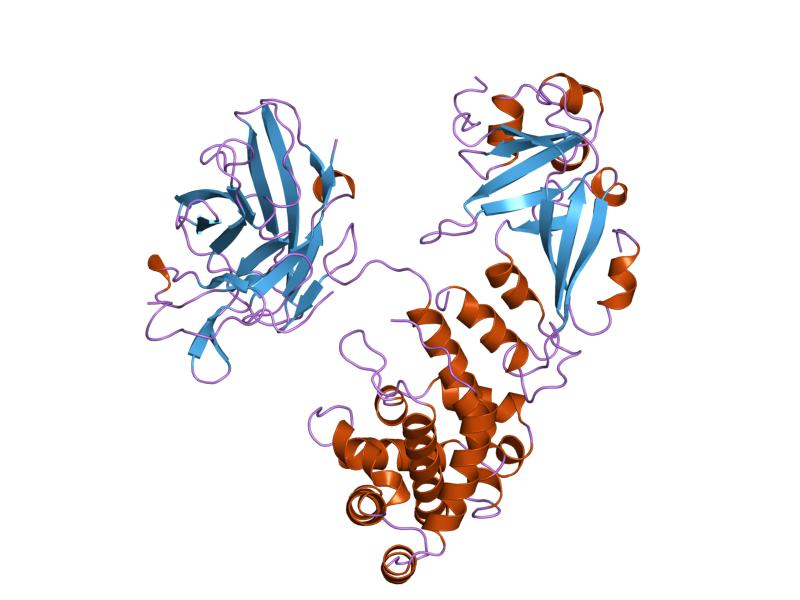
- Cartoon representation of the diphtheria toxin protein

Identifiers
- Organism: Corynebacterium diphtheriae
- Symbol: tox
- Entrez: 2650491
- Orthologs: NCBI: entry; OMA: entry
- RefSeq (Prot): NP_938615
- UniProt: P00587

Other data
- EC number: 2.4.2.36
- Chromosome: genome: 0.19 - 0.19 Mb
Search for
- Structures: Swiss-model
- Domains: InterPro

Diphtheria toxin, C domain

Identifiers
- Symbol: Diphtheria_C
- Pfam: PF02763
- Pfam clan: CL0084
- InterPro: IPR022406
- SCOP2: 1ddt / SCOPe / SUPFAM
- TCDB: 1.C.7
Available protein structures:
- PDB: IPR022406 PF02763 (ECOD; PDBsum)
- AlphaFold: IPR022406; PF02763

Diphtheria toxin, T domain

Identifiers
- Symbol: Diphtheria_T
- Pfam: PF02764
- InterPro: IPR022405
- SCOP2: 1ddt / SCOPe / SUPFAM
- TCDB: 1.C.7
Available protein structures:
- PDB: IPR022405 PF02764 (ECOD; PDBsum)
- AlphaFold: IPR022405; PF02764

Diphtheria toxin, R domain

Identifiers
- Symbol: Diphtheria_R
- Pfam: PF01324
- InterPro: IPR022404
- SCOP2: 1ddt / SCOPe / SUPFAM
- TCDB: 1.C.7
Available protein structures:
- PDB: IPR022404 PF01324 (ECOD; PDBsum)
- AlphaFold: IPR022404; PF01324

Diphtheria toxin is an exotoxin secreted mainly by Corynebacterium diphtheriae (but also by Corynebacterium ulcerans and Corynebacterium pseudotuberculosis), the pathogenic bacterium that causes diphtheria. The toxin gene is encoded by a prophage (Note: A prophage is a virus that has inserted itself into the genome of the host bacterium.) called corynephage β. The toxin causes the disease in humans by gaining entry into the cell cytoplasm and inhibiting protein synthesis.

== Structure ==
Diphtheria toxin is a single polypeptide chain of 535 amino acids consisting of two subunits linked by disulfide bridges, known as an A-B toxin. Binding of the cell surface by the B subunit (the less stable of the two subunits) allows the A subunit (the more stable part of the protein) to penetrate the host cell.

The crystal structure of the diphtheria toxin homodimer has been determined to 2.5 Ångstrom resolution. The structure reveals a Y-shaped molecule consisting of three domains. Fragment A contains the catalytic C domain, and fragment B consists of the T and R domains:

- The amino-terminal catalytic domain, known as the C domain, has an unusual beta+alpha fold. The C domain blocks protein synthesis by transfer of ADP-ribose from NAD to a diphthamide residue of eukaryotic elongation factor 2 (eEF-2).
- A central translocation domain, known as the T domain or TM domain, has a multi-helical globin-like fold with two additional helices at the amino terminus but no counterpart to the first globin helix. This domain is thought to unfold in the membrane. A pH-induced conformational change in the T domain triggers insertion into the endosomal membrane and facilitates the transfer of the C domain into the cytoplasm.
- A carboxy-terminal receptor-binding domain, known as the R domain, has a beta-sandwich fold consisting of nine strands in two sheets with Greek-key topology; it is a subclass of immunoglobulin-like fold. The R domain binds to a cell surface receptor, permitting the toxin to enter the cell by receptor-mediated endocytosis.

== Mechanism ==
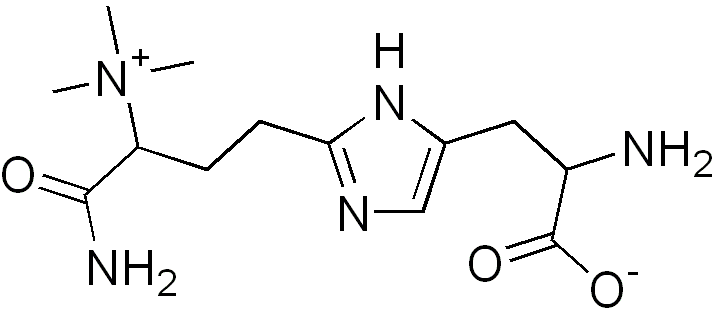
Diphthamide

The diphtheria toxin has the same mechanism of action as the enzyme NAD(+)—diphthamide ADP-ribosyltransferase (EC 2.4.2.36). It catalyzes the ADP ribosylation of the unusual amino acid diphthamide in eEF-2 by transferring the ADP-ribosyl group from NAD^{+}. The ADP ribosylation of diphthamide inactivates the eEF-2 protein, thus, inhibiting the translation of mRNA. The catalysed reaction is as follows:

NAD^{+} + peptide diphthamide $\rightleftharpoons$ nicotinamide + peptide N-(ADP-D-ribosyl)diphthamide.

The exotoxin A of Pseudomonas aeruginosa uses a similar mechanism of action.

The steps involved in generating toxicity are as follows:

1. Processing
  1. The leader region is cleaved during secretion.
  2. Proteolytic nicking separates A and B subunits, which remain joined by disulfide bonds until they reach the cytosol.
2. The toxin binds to heparin-binding epidermal growth factor precursor (HB-EGF).
3. The complex undergoes endocytosis by the host cell.
4. Acidification inside the endosome induces translocation of the A subunit into the cytosol.
  1. Disulfide bonds are broken.
  2. The B subunit remains in the endosome as a pore.
5. The A subunit ADP-ribosylates host eEF-2, which is required for protein synthesis; when it is inactivated, the host cannot make protein and thus dies.

== Lethal dose and effects ==
Diphtheria toxin is extraordinarily potent. The lethal dose for humans is about 0.1 μg of toxin per kg of body weight. Death occurs through necrosis of the heart and liver. Diphtheria toxin has also been associated with the development of myocarditis. Myocarditis secondary to diphtheria toxin is considered one of the biggest risks to unimmunized children.

== History ==
Diphtheria toxin was discovered in 1888 by Émile Roux and Alexandre Yersin. In 1890, Emil Adolf von Behring developed an anti-toxin based on the blood of horses immunized with attenuated bacteria. In 1951, Freeman found that the toxin gene was not encoded on the bacterial chromosome, but by a lysogenic phage (corynephage β) infecting all toxigenic strains.

== Clinical use ==
The drug denileukin diftitox uses diphtheria toxin as an antineoplastic agent.

Resimmune is an immunotoxin that is in clinical trials in cutaneous T cell lymphoma patients. It uses diphtheria toxin (truncated by the cell binding domain) coupled to an antibody to CD3ε (UCHT1).

== Research ==
Similar to other A-B toxins, diphtheria toxin is adept at transporting exogenous proteins across mammalian cell membranes, which are usually impermeable to large proteins. This unique ability can be repurposed to deliver therapeutic proteins, instead of the catalytic domain of the toxin.

This toxin has also been used in neuroscientific and cancer research to ablate specific populations of cells which express the diphtheria toxin receptor (heparin-binding EGF-like growth factor). Administration of the toxin into the organism which does not naturally express this receptor (e.g. mice) will result in the selective ablation of the cell population which do express it.
