= Resimmune =

Experimental cancer drug

Clinical data
- Trade names: Resimmune
- Pregnancy category: (no adequate human studies)
- Routes of administration: Intravenous
- ATC code: none

Legal status
- Legal status: Experimental

Pharmacokinetic data
- Elimination half-life: 42–66 min

Identifiers
- IUPAC name: A-dmDT390-bisFv(UCHT1)
- CAS Number: 1470038-56-2
- ChemSpider: none
- UNII: P7MQ9ZOQ82

Resimmune or A-dmDT390-bisFv(UCHT1) is an experimental drug — an anti-T cell immunotoxin — that is being investigated for the treatment of T cell blood cancers such as cutaneous T cell lymphoma (CTCL). It was developed by Doctors Neville, Woo, and Liu while at the National Institutes of Health (NIH) and is under exclusive license to Angimmune, LLC. The therapy has potential applications for lymphomas and T cell driven autoimmune diseases, including multiple sclerosis, and graft-versus-host disease following stem cell or bone marrow transplant.

== Clinical trials ==
Since 2009, Resimmune is being tested against cutaneous T cell lymphoma, and is in a Phase II trial: A-dmDT390-bisFv(UCHT1) Immunotoxin Therapy for Patients With T-cell Diseases. All patients had failed at least one conventional therapy. In the Phase I portion of the trail, a subgroup of nine patients was identified with an 89% response rate. This subgroup was Stage IB-IIB with mSWAT scores of less than 50. The complete response rate was 50% (two of which are over 72 months duration and could represent cures). A major exclusion to entering the trial is a past history of heart disease, or prior treatment with alemtuzumab (Campath).

A second clinical trial is open to test if Resimmune can act as an immunomodulator of late stage metastatic melanoma.

== Description of molecule ==
Resimmune is a bivalent anti-T cell immunotoxin, A-dmDT390-bisFv(UCHT1). The diphtheria toxin moiety has been modified to include an NH2-terminal alanine (A) and two double mutations (dm) have been made to prevent glycosylation in the eukaryotic expression system, Pichia pastoris.). The bivalent immunotoxin, A-dmDT390-bisFv(UCHT1) contains the first 390 amino acid residues of diphtheria toxin (DT) and two tandem sFv molecules derived from UCHT1 parental antibody (an anti-CD3 antibody). The first 390 amino acid residues of DT (DT390) contain the catalytic domain or A chain of DT that inhibits protein synthesis by ADP ribosylation of elongation factor 2 (EF-2) and the translocation domain that translocates the catalytic domain to the cytosol by interaction with cytosolic Hsp90 and thioredoxin reductase. This single chain recombinant immunotoxin selectively kills human malignant T cells and transiently depletes normal T cells. Malignant T cells are 30-fold more sensitive to A-dmDT390-bisFv(UCHT1) compared to normal resting T cells.

== Mechanism of action ==
Resimmune works by killing malignant T cells, targeting the CD3 T cell receptor complex and transiently depleting all T cells by 2-3 log units. After the four-day treatment, normal T cells are repopulated by homeostatic proliferation. This process may have an immunomodulatory effect that leads to further elimination of residual tumor cells by activation of novel naïve T cells.
