= Elongation factor 2 kinase =

Class of enzymes

eukaryotic elongation factor-2 kinase

Identifiers
- EC no.: 2.7.11.20

Databases
- IntEnz: IntEnz view
- BRENDA: BRENDA entry
- ExPASy: NiceZyme view
- KEGG: KEGG entry
- MetaCyc: metabolic pathway
- PRIAM: profile
- PDB structures: RCSB PDB PDBe PDBsum
- Gene Ontology: AmiGO / QuickGO
Search
- PMC: articles
- PubMed: articles
- NCBI: proteins

In enzymology, an elongation factor 2 kinase (EC 2.7.11.20) is an enzyme that catalyzes the chemical reaction:

ATP + [elongation factor 2] $\rightleftharpoons$ ADP + [elongation factor 2] phosphate.

Thus, the two substrates of this enzyme are ATP and elongation factor 2, whereas its two products are adenosine diphosphate (ADP) and elongation factor 2 phosphate.

== Nomenclature ==
This enzyme belongs to the family of transferases, specifically those transferring a phosphate group to the sidechain oxygen atom of serine or threonine residues in proteins (protein-serine/threonine kinases). The systematic name of this enzyme class is "ATP:[elongation factor 2] phosphotransferase". Other names in common use include Ca/CaM-kinase III, calmodulin-dependent protein kinase III, CaM kinase III, eEF2 kinase, eEF-2K, eEF2K, EF2K, and STK19.

== Function ==
The only known physiological substrate of eEF-2K is eEF-2. Phosphorylation of eEF-2 at Thr-56 by eEF-2K leads to inhibition of the elongation phase of protein synthesis. Phosphorylation of Thr-56 is thought to reduce the affinity of eEF-2 for the ribosome, thereby slowing down the overall rate of elongation. However, there is growing evidence to suggest that translation of certain mRNAs is actually increased by phosphorylation of eEF-2 by eEF-2K, especially in a neuronal context.

== Activation ==
The activity of eEF-2K is dependent on calcium and calmodulin. Activation of eEF-2K proceeds by a sequential two-step mechanism. First, calcium-calmodulin binds with high affinity to activate the kinase domain, triggering rapid autophosphorylation of Thr-348. In the second step, autophosphorylation of Thr-348 leads to a conformational change in the kinase likely supported by the binding of phospho-Thr-348 to an allosteric phosphate binding pocket in the kinase domain. This increases the activity of eEF-2K against its substrate, elongation factor 2.

eEF-2K can gain calcium-independent activity through autophosphorylation of Ser-500. However, calmodulin must remain bound to the enzyme for its activity to be sustained.

== Cancer ==
eEF-2K expression is often upregulated in cancer cells, including breast and pancreatic cancers and promotes cell proliferation, survival, motility/migration, invasion and tumorigenesis.
