= PARP3 =

Protein-coding gene in the species Homo sapiens

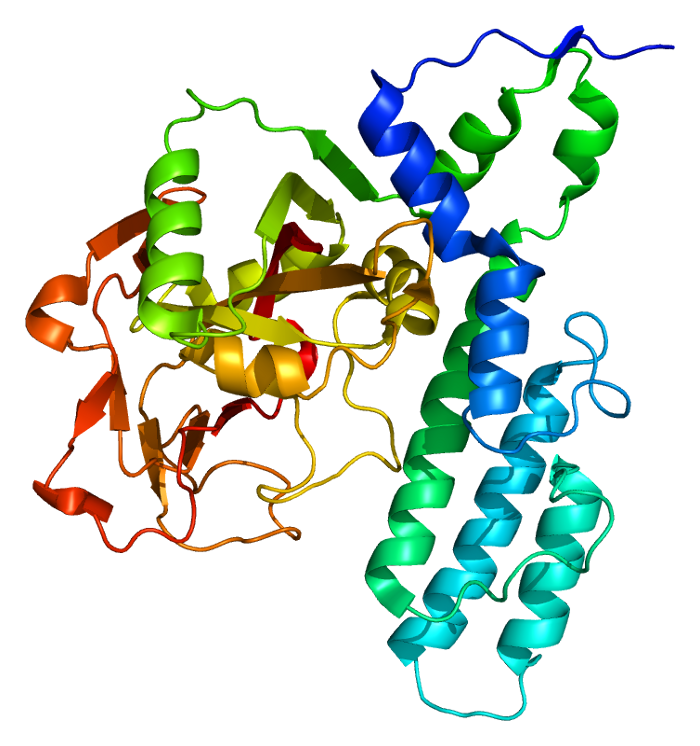

Identifiers
- Aliases: PARP3, ADPRT3, ADPRTL2, ADPRTL3, ARTD3, IRT1, PADPRT-3, poly(ADP-ribose) polymerase family member 3
- External IDs: OMIM: 607726; MGI: 1891258; GeneCards: PARP3
Available structures
PDB	Ortholog search: PDBe RCSB
PDB	List of PDB id codes 2EOC, 3C49, 3C4H, 3CE0, 3FHB, 4GV0, 4GV2, 4GV4, 4L6Z, 4L70, 4L7L, 4L7N, 4L7O, 4L7P, 4L7R, 4L7U

Gene location (Human)
Chr.	Chromosome 3 (human)
Band	3p21.2	Start	51,942,345 bp
Band	3p21.2	End	51,948,867 bp

Gene location (Mouse)
Chr.	Chromosome 9 (mouse)
Band	9|9 F1	Start	106,347,521 bp
Band	9|9 F1	End	106,354,148 bp
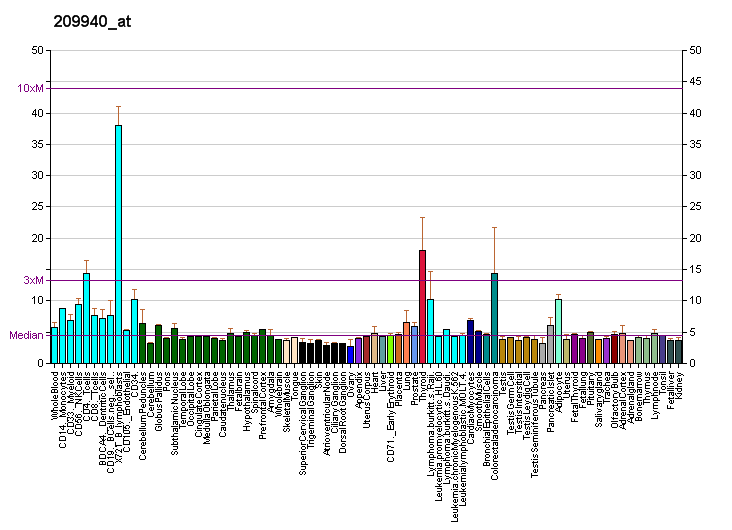
RNA expression pattern
Bgee	Human / Mouse (ortholog); Top expressed in: right adrenal cortex; left adrenal gland; left adrenal cortex; right lobe of liver; apex of heart; right lobe of thyroid gland; left lobe of thyroid gland; muscle layer of sigmoid colon; transverse colon; stromal cell of endometrium / Top expressed in: extraocular muscle; ankle; temporal muscle; triceps brachii muscle; digastric muscle; sternocleidomastoid muscle; vastus lateralis muscle; gastrocnemius muscle; mesenteric lymph nodes; medial head of gastrocnemius muscle; More reference expression data
BioGPS	More reference expression data
Gene ontology
Molecular function	transferase activity; glycosyltransferase activity; catalytic activity; NAD+ ADP-ribosyltransferase activity; DNA ligase (ATP) activity; protein ADP-ribosylase activity; protein binding; NAD DNA ADP-ribosyltransferase activity
Cellular component	cytoplasm; site of double-strand break; centriole; cytoskeleton; nucleus; microtubule organizing center; nucleolus; chromosome
Biological process	protein localization to site of double-strand break; DNA ligation involved in DNA repair; lagging strand elongation; regulation of mitotic spindle organization; positive regulation of DNA ligation; telomere maintenance; double-strand break repair; protein ADP-ribosylation; DNA repair; negative regulation of telomerase RNA reverse transcriptase activity; protein poly-ADP-ribosylation; DNA ADP-ribosylation; negative regulation of isotype switching; protein auto-ADP-ribosylation; protein mono-ADP-ribosylation; positive regulation of double-strand break repair via nonhomologous end joining; cellular response to DNA damage stimulus
Sources:Amigo / QuickGO
Orthologs
Databases	NCBI: entry; OMA: entry
Species	Human	Mouse
Entrez	10039	235587
Ensembl	ENSG00000041880	ENSMUSG00000023249
UniProt	Q9Y6F1	Q3ULW8
RefSeq (mRNA)	NM_001003931; NM_001003935; NM_005485; NM_001370239; NM_001370240	NM_145619; NM_001311150
RefSeq (protein)	NP_001003931; NP_005476; NP_001357168; NP_001357169	NP_001298079; NP_663594
Location (UCSC)	Chr 3: 51.94 – 51.95 Mb	Chr 9: 106.35 – 106.35 Mb
PubMed search
- Wikidata
View/Edit Human	View/Edit Mouse

Poly [ADP-ribose] polymerase 3 is an enzyme that in humans is encoded by the PARP3 gene.

The protein encoded by this gene belongs to the PARP family. These enzymes modify nuclear proteins by poly-ADP-ribosylation, which is required for DNA repair, regulation of apoptosis, and maintenance of genomic stability. This gene encodes the poly(ADP-ribosyl)transferase 3, which is preferentially localized to the daughter centriole throughout the cell cycle. Alternatively spliced transcript variants encoding different isoforms have been identified.
