= Immunocompetence =

Ability to produce a normal immune response to an antigen

In immunology, immunocompetence is the ability of the body to produce a normal immune response following exposure to an antigen. Immunocompetence is the opposite of immunodeficiency (also known as immuno-incompetence or being immuno-compromised).

In reference to lymphocytes, immunocompetence means that a B cell or T cell is mature and can recognize antigens and allow a person to mount an immune response. In order for lymphocytes such as T cells to become immunocompetent, which refers to the ability of lymphocyte cell receptors to recognize MHC molecules, they must undergo positive selection. Adaptive immunocompetence is regulated by growth hormone (GH), prolactin (PRL), and vasopressin (VP) – hormones secreted by the pituitary gland.

== See also ==
- Immunopharmacology and Immunotoxicology (medical journal)
- Parasite-stress theory
