= Clostridium botulinum C3 toxin =

C3 exoenzyme
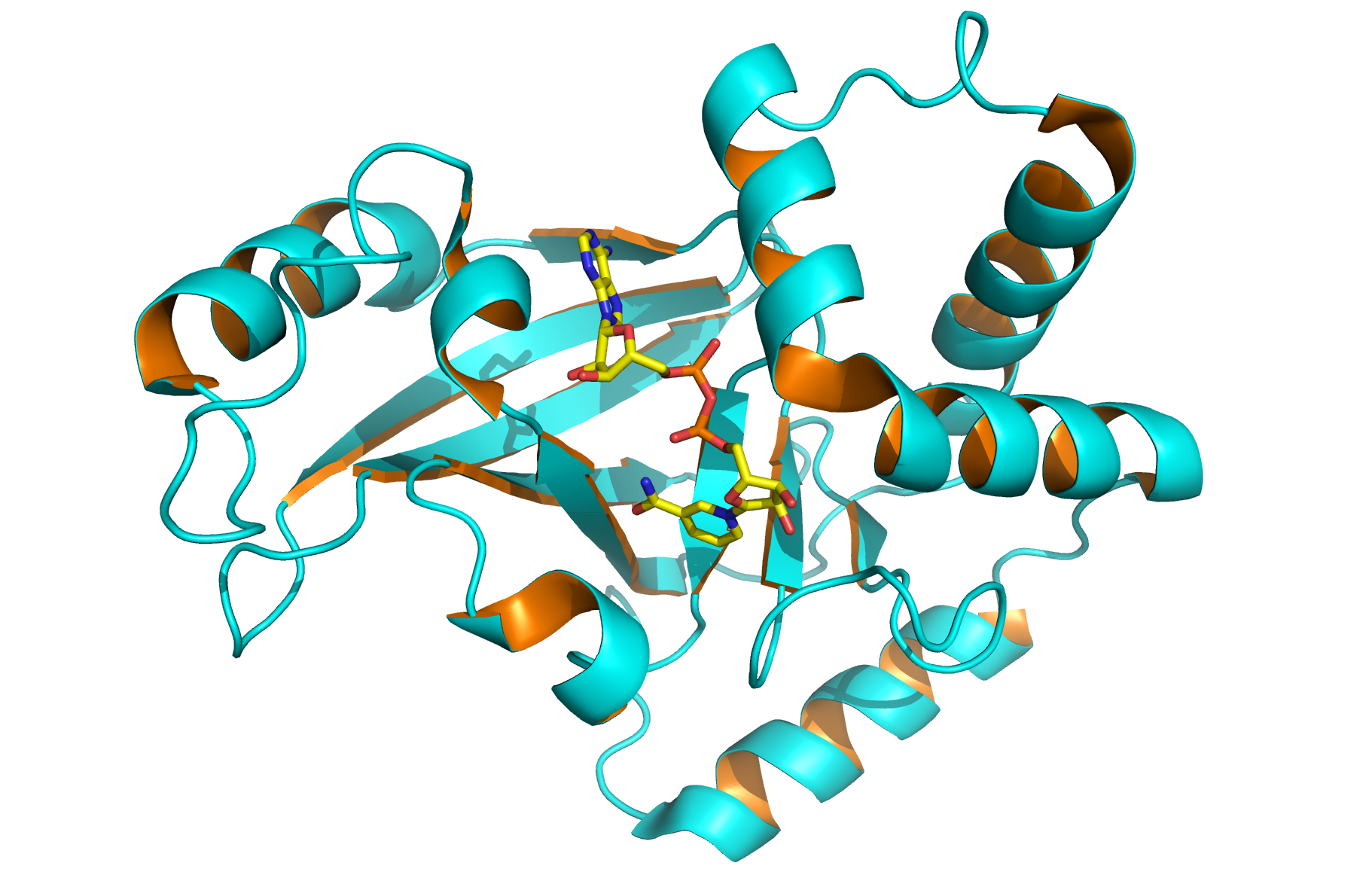
- Structure of Clostridium botulinum C3 exoenzyme NAD from PDB entry 2C8C

Identifiers
- Symbol: C3
- SCOP2: 2C89 / SCOPe / SUPFAM
Available protein structures:
- Pfam
- PDB: 2C8A, 2C8B, 2C8C, 2C8D

Clostridium botulinum C3 exoenzyme is a toxin that causes the addition of one or more ADP-ribose moieties to Rho-like proteins. Many bacterial toxins nucleotide-binding modify by ADP-ribosylation proteins involved in essential cell functions, leading to their toxic effects.

== Action ==
The molecular basis of the action of these enzymes consists in binding of nicotinamide adenine dinucleotide (NAD), splitting NAD into its ADP-ribose and nicotinamide components, and transferring the ADP-ribose moiety to a specific residue on to a protein substrate, often of eukaryotic origin. All the toxins of this family share a highly conserved glutamate, which is the catalytic residue critical for the NAD-glycohydrolase activity. ADP-ribosyltransferase toxins have distinct substrate specificities and variable pathophysiological properties and can be subdivided into four subfamilies: diphtheria-like toxins, cholera-like toxins, binary toxins and C3-like exoenzymes.

C3-like exoenzymes unlike other ADP-ribosyltransferase toxins do not require a specific cell-surface binding translocation component for cell entry. Their specificity is for the small GTP-binding proteins RhoA, RhoB, and RhoC, which are ADP-ribosylated on an asparagine residue.
