= Heparin-binding EGF-like growth factor =

Protein-coding gene in the species Homo sapiens

HBEGF
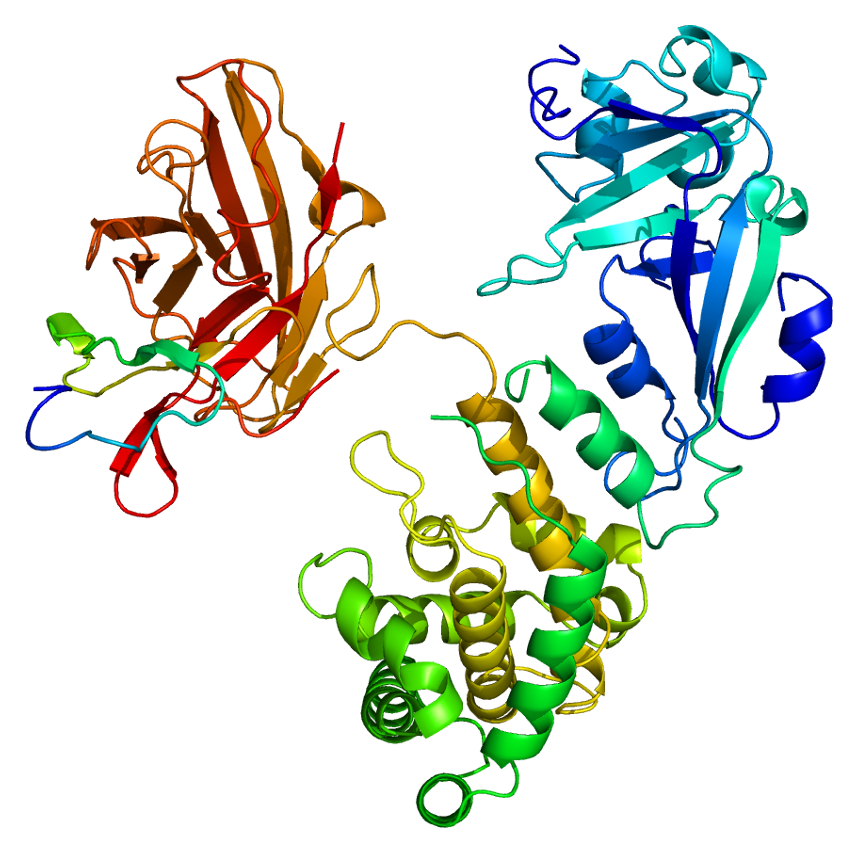

Identifiers
- Aliases: HBEGF, DTR, DTS, DTSF, HEGFL, heparin binding EGF like growth factor
- External IDs: OMIM: 126150; MGI: 96070; GeneCards: HBEGF
Available structures
| PDB | Ortholog search: PDBe RCSB |
| PDB | List of PDB id codes 1XDT, 2M8S |

Gene location (Human)
| Chr. | Chromosome 5 (human) |
| Band | 5q31.3 | Start | 140,332,843 bp |
| Band | 5q31.3 | End | 140,346,603 bp |

Gene location (Mouse)
| Chr. | Chromosome 18 (mouse) |
| Band | 18 B2|18 19.46 cM | Start | 36,637,980 bp |
| Band | 18 B2|18 19.46 cM | End | 36,648,858 bp |
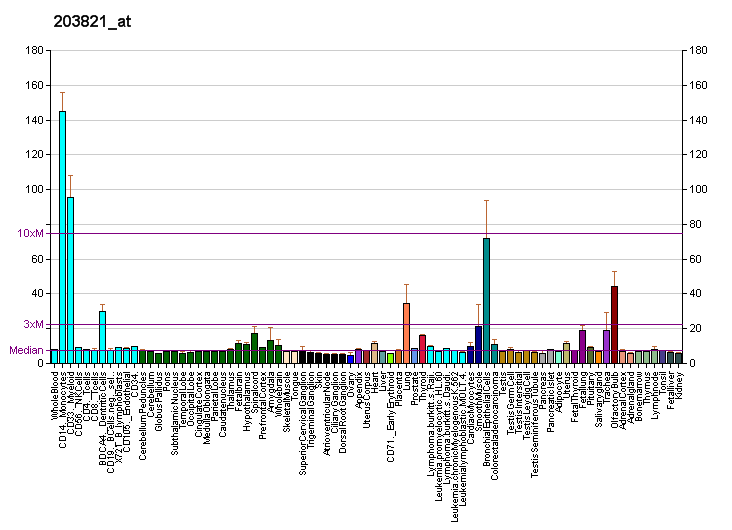

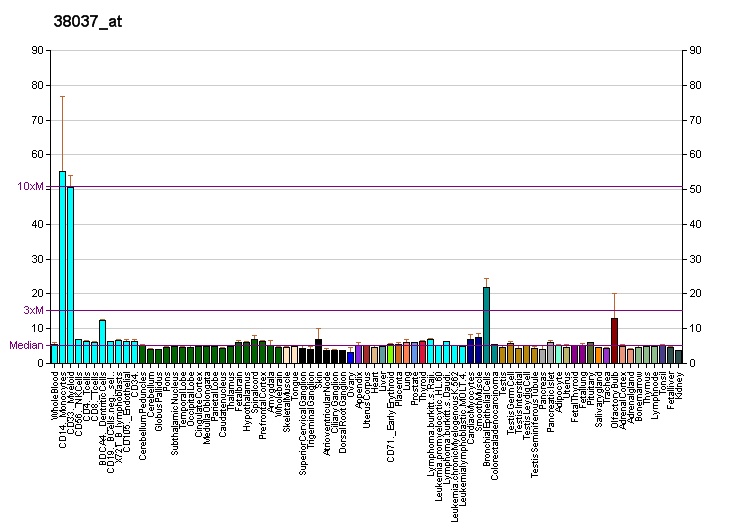
RNA expression pattern
| Bgee | Human / Mouse (ortholog); Top expressed in: synovial joint; gallbladder; mucosa of urinary bladder; lower lobe of lung; synovial membrane; upper lobe of left lung; Skeletal muscle tissue of rectus abdominis; pericardium; skin of thigh; apex of heart / Top expressed in: ankle; ankle joint; decidua; muscle of thigh; sciatic nerve; triceps brachii muscle; endothelial cell of lymphatic vessel; lumbar subsegment of spinal cord; epithelium of lens; right lung; More reference expression data |
| BioGPS | More reference expression data |
Gene ontology
| Molecular function | growth factor activity; heparin binding; protein tyrosine kinase activity; phosphatidylinositol-4,5-bisphosphate 3-kinase activity; epidermal growth factor receptor binding |
| Cellular component | extracellular region; endocytic vesicle membrane; integral component of membrane; membrane; cell surface; plasma membrane; clathrin-coated endocytic vesicle membrane; integral component of plasma membrane; extracellular space; clathrin-coated vesicle membrane |
| Biological process | positive regulation of keratinocyte migration; cell chemotaxis; MAPK cascade; signal transduction; wound healing, spreading of epidermal cells; positive regulation of cell migration; positive regulation of cell growth; muscle organ development; positive regulation of smooth muscle cell proliferation; regulation of heart contraction; negative regulation of elastin biosynthetic process; cell migration; positive regulation of wound healing; epidermal growth factor receptor signaling pathway; ERBB2 signaling pathway; phosphatidylinositol phosphate biosynthetic process; peptidyl-tyrosine phosphorylation; regulation of cell motility; positive regulation of cell population proliferation; positive regulation of peptidyl-tyrosine phosphorylation; regulation of signaling receptor activity; positive regulation of protein kinase B signaling; negative regulation of epidermal growth factor receptor signaling pathway; membrane organization |
Sources:Amigo / QuickGO
Orthologs
| Databases | NCBI: entry; OMA: entry |
| Species | Human | Mouse |
| Entrez | 1839 | 15200 |
| Ensembl | ENSG00000113070 | ENSMUSG00000024486 |
| UniProt | Q99075 | Q06186 |
| RefSeq (mRNA) | NM_001945 | NM_010415 |
| RefSeq (protein) | NP_001936 | NP_034545 |
| Location (UCSC) | Chr 5: 140.33 – 140.35 Mb | Chr 18: 36.64 – 36.65 Mb |
| PubMed search |
- Wikidata
| View/Edit Human | View/Edit Mouse |

Heparin-binding EGF-like growth factor (HB-EGF) is a member of the EGF family of proteins that in humans is encoded by the HBEGF gene.

HB-EGF-like growth factor is synthesized as a membrane-anchored mitogenic and chemotactic glycoprotein. An epidermal growth factor produced by monocytes and macrophages, due to an affinity for heparin is termed HB-EGF. It has been shown to play a role in wound healing, cardiac hypertrophy, and heart development and function. First identified in the conditioned media of human macrophage-like cells, HB-EGF is an 87-amino acid glycoprotein that displays highly regulated gene expression. Ectodomain shedding results in the soluble mature form of HB-EGF, which influences the mitogenicity and chemotactic factors for smooth muscle cells and fibroblasts. The transmembrane form of HB-EGF is the unique receptor for diphtheria toxin and functions in juxtacrine signaling in cells. Both forms of HB-EGF participate in normal physiological processes and in pathological processes including tumor progression and metastasis, organ hyperplasia, and atherosclerotic disease. HB-EGF can bind two locations on cell surfaces: heparan sulfate proteoglycans and EGF-receptors effecting cell-to-cell interactions.

== Interactions ==
Heparin-binding EGF-like growth factor has been shown to interact with NRD1, Zinc finger and BTB domain-containing protein 16 and BAG1.

HB-EGF biological activities with these genes influence cell cycle progression, molecular chaperone regulation, cell survival, cellular functions, adhesion, and mediation of cell migration. The NRD1 gene codes for the protein nardilysin, an HB-EGF modulator. Zinc finger and BTB domain-containing protein 16 and BAG family molecular chaperone regulator function as co-chaperone proteins in processes involving HB-EGF.

== Role in cancer ==
Studies indicate significant HB-EGF gene expression elevation in a number of human cancers as well as cancer-derived cell lines. Evidence indicates that HB-EGF plays a significant role in the development of malignant phenotypes contributing to the metastatic and invasive behaviors of tumors. The proliferative and chemotactic effects of HB-EGF results from the target influence on particular cells including fibroblasts, smooth muscles cells, and keratinocytes. For numerous cell types such as breast and ovarian tumor cells, human epithelial cells and keratinocytes HB-EGF is a potent mitogen resulting in evidenced upregulation of HB-EGF in such specimens. Both in vivo and in vitro studies of tumor formation in cancer derived cell lines indicate that expression of HB-EGF is essential for tumor development. As a result, studies implementing the use of specific HB-EGF inhibitors and monoclonal antibodies against HB-EGF show the potential for the development of novel therapies for treating cancers by targeting HB-EGF expression.

== Role in cardiac development and vasculature ==
HB-EGF binding and activation of EGF receptors plays a critical role during cardiac valve tissue development and the maintenance of normal heart function in adults. During valve tissue development the interaction of HB-EGF with EGF receptors and heparan sulfate proteoglycans is essential for the prevention of malformation of valves due to enlargement. In the vascular system areas of disturbed flow show upregulation of HB-EGF with promotion of vascular lesions, atherogenesis, and hyperplasia of intimal tissue in vessels. The flow disturbance remodeling of the vascular tissues due to HB-EGF expression contributes to aortic valve disease, peripheral vascular disease, and conduit stenosis.

== Role in wound healing ==
HB-EGF is the predominant growth factor in the epithelialization required for cutaneous wound healing. The mitogenic and migratory effects of HB-EGF on keratinocytes and fibroblasts promotes dermal repair and angiogenesis necessary for wound healing and is a major component of wound fluids. HB-EGF displays target cell specificity during the early stages of wound healing being released by macrophages, monocytes, and keratinocytes. HB-EGF cell surface binding to heparan sulfate proteoglycans enhances mitogen promoting capabilities increasing the rate of skin wound healing, decreasing human skin graft healing times, and promotes rapid healing of ulcers, burns, and epidermal split thickness wounds.

== Role in other physiological processes ==
HB-EGF is recognized as an important component for the modulation of cell activity in various biological interactions. Found widely distributed in cerebral neurons and neuroglia, HB-EGF induced by brain hypoxia and or ischemia subsequently stimulates neurogenesis. Interactions between uterine HB-EGF and epidermal growth factor receptors of blastocysts influence embryo-uterine interactions and implantation. Studies show HB-EGF protects intestinal stem cells and intestinal epithelial cells in necrotizing enterocolitis, a disease affecting premature newborns. Associated with a breakdown in gut barrier function, necrotizing enterocolitis may be mediated by HB-EGF effects on intestinal mucosa. HB-EGF expressed during skeletal muscle contraction facilitates peripheral glucose removal, glucose tolerance and uptake. The upregulation of HB-EGF with exercise may explain the molecular basis for the decrease in metabolic disorders such as obesity and type 2 diabetes with regular exercise.
