= Poly(ADP-ribose) glycohydrolase =

Identifiers
- EC no.: 3.2.1.143
- CAS no.: 9068-16-0

Databases
- IntEnz: IntEnz view
- BRENDA: BRENDA entry
- ExPASy: NiceZyme view
- KEGG: KEGG entry
- MetaCyc: metabolic pathway
- PRIAM: profile
- PDB structures: RCSB PDB PDBe PDBsum
Search
- PMC: articles
- PubMed: articles
- NCBI: proteins

Poly(ADP-ribose) glycohydrolase (EC 3.2.1.143) is an enzyme. This enzyme catalyses the following chemical reaction

hydrolyses poly(ADP-ribose) at glycosidic (1''-2') linkage of ribose-ribose bond to produce free ADP-ribose

Specific to (1''-2') linkage of ribose-ribose bond of poly(ADP-ribose).
