= Immunopharmacology and Immunotoxicology =

Peer-reviewed journal

- Discipline: Immunology, pharmacology, toxicology
- Language: English
- Edited by: Anders Elm Pedersen

Publication details
- History: 1978–present
- Publisher: Informa Pharmaceutical Science (United Kingdom)
- Frequency: Bimonthly
- Impact factor: 1.203 (2014)

Standard abbreviations
- ISO 4: Immunopharmacol. Immunotoxicol.

Indexing
- ISSN: 0892-3973 (print); 1532-2513 (web)

Links
- Journal homepage; Online access

Immunopharmacology and Immunotoxicology is a bimonthly peer-reviewed medical journal that covers preclinical and clinical studies on the regulatory effects of various agents on immunocompetent cells, as well as the immunotoxicity exerted by xenobiotics and drugs. Hence, the journal encompasses a broad range of pathologies (e.g. acute and chronic infections, allergy, autoimmunity, cancer, degenerative disorders, inflammation, and primary and secondary immunodeficiencies). It is published by Informa.

== Editor-in-chief ==
The editor-in-chief of Immunopharmacology and Immunotoxicology is Anders Elm Pedersen, University of Copenhagen, Danmark.

== Impact factor ==
According to the Journal Citation Reports it received in 2014 an impact factor of 1.203, ranking it 133rd out of 148 journals in the category "Immunology", ranking it 204th out of 254 journals in the category "Pharmacology & Pharmacy" and ranking it 73rd out of 87 journals in the category "Toxicology".
