= Immunotoxin =

An immunotoxin is an artificial protein consisting of a targeting portion linked to a toxin. When the protein binds to that cell, it is taken in through endocytosis, and the toxin kills the cell. They are used for the treatment of some kinds of cancer and a few viral infections.

== Design ==
These chimeric proteins are usually made of a modified antibody or antibody fragment, attached to a fragment of a toxin. The targeting portion is composed of the Fab portion of an antibody that targets a specific cell type. The toxin is usually an AB toxin, a cytotoxic protein derived from a bacterial or plant protein, from which the natural binding domain has been removed so that the Fv directs the toxin to the antigen on the target cell.

Sometimes recombinant fusion proteins containing a toxin and a growth factor are also referred to as recombinant immunotoxins, although they do not contain an antibody fragment. A more specific name for this latter kind of protein is recombinant fusion toxin.

== Production ==
They were originally produced by attaching the antibody to the toxin using a chemical linker. They are now made using recombinant DNA techniques, are produced in bacteria like E. coli called recombinant immunotoxins.

== Function ==
The antibody (or other targeting moiety) binds to an antigen on the target cell and the toxin then enters and kills the cell.

== Clinical application ==
The best clinical success has been achieved in treating patients with refractory hairy cell leukemia. These patients were treated with the recombinant immunotoxin which targets the CD22 cell surface receptor on these leukemic cells. In two uncontrolled clinical studies, about half of participants achieved a complete response after BL22 treatment. This therapeutic has been superseded by HA22, a slightly modified version.

A recent Phase I study of Resimmune found an 89% response rate in a subgroup of nine patients with cutaneous T cell lymphoma. This subgroup was Stage IB-IIB with mSWAT scores of less than 50. The complete response rate was 50% (two of which are over 72 months duration and could represent cures).

== See also ==
- Denileukin diftitox, an immunotoxin used to treat T cell leukemias
- Resimmune, or A-dmDT390-bisFv(UCHT1), an experimental anti-T cell immunotoxin in clinical trials to treat cutaneous T-cell lymphoma and metastatic melanoma.
- Anti-CD22 immunotoxins, being tested in hairy cell leukemia
- Antibody-drug conjugates, most, if not all, are immunotoxins but use whole antibodies and non-protein drugs
- Immunopharmacology and Immunotoxicology (medical journal)
