= NAD(P)(+)—protein-arginine ADP-ribosyltransferase =

Class of enzymes

NAD(P)+-protein-arginine ADP-ribosyltransferase

Identifiers
- EC no.: 2.4.2.31
- CAS no.: 81457-93-4

Databases
- IntEnz: IntEnz view
- BRENDA: BRENDA entry
- ExPASy: NiceZyme view
- KEGG: KEGG entry
- MetaCyc: metabolic pathway
- PRIAM: profile
- PDB structures: RCSB PDB PDBe PDBsum
- Gene Ontology: AmiGO / QuickGO
Search
- PMC: articles
- PubMed: articles
- NCBI: proteins

ART
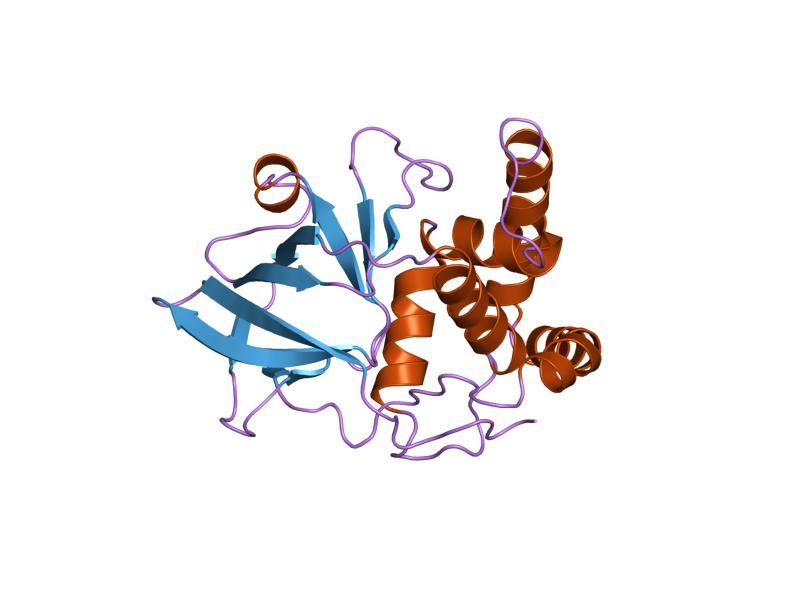
- crystal structure of the eucaryotic mono-adp-ribosyltransferase art2.2; crystal form c (p3121)

Identifiers
- Symbol: ART
- Pfam: PF01129
- Pfam clan: CL0084
- InterPro: IPR000768
- SMART: START
- PROSITE: PDOC00993
- SCOP2: 1gy0 / SCOPe / SUPFAM
Available protein structures:
- Pfam: structures / ECOD
- PDB: RCSB PDB; PDBe; PDBj
- PDBsum: structure summary

In enzymology, a NAD(P)+-protein-arginine ADP-ribosyltransferase (EC 2.4.2.31) is an enzyme that catalyzes the chemical reaction using nicotinamide adenine dinucleotide

NAD^{+} + protein L-arginine $\rightleftharpoons$ nicotinamide + Nomega-(ADP-D-ribosyl)-protein-L-arginine NADP^{+} + protein L-arginine $\rightleftharpoons$ nicotinamide + Nomega-[(2'-phospho-ADP)-D-ribosyl]-protein-L-arginine

as well as the corresponding reaction using nicotinamide adenine dinucleotide phosphate

NADP^{+} + protein L-arginine $\rightleftharpoons$ nicotinamide + Nomega-(ADP-D-ribosyl)-protein-L-arginine NADP^{+} + protein L-arginine $\rightleftharpoons$ nicotinamide + Nomega-[(2'-phospho-ADP)-D-ribosyl]-protein-L-arginine

Thus, the two substrates of this enzyme are NAD^{+} (or NADP^{+}) and protein L-arginine, whereas its two products are nicotinamide and Nomega-(ADP-D-ribosyl)-protein-L-arginine (or Nomega-[(2'-phospho-ADP)-D-ribosyl]-protein-L-arginine, respectively).

This enzyme belongs to the family of glycosyltransferases, specifically the pentosyltransferases. The systematic name of this enzyme class is NAD(P)+:protein-L-arginine ADP-D-ribosyltransferase. Other names in common use include ADP-ribosyltransferase, mono(ADP-ribosyl)transferase, NAD+:L-arginine ADP-D-ribosyltransferase, NAD(P)+-arginine ADP-ribosyltransferase, and NAD(P)+:L-arginine ADP-D-ribosyltransferase.

At least five forms of the enzyme have been characterised to date, some of which are attached to the membrane via glycosylphosphatidylinositol (GPI) anchors, while others appear to be secreted. The enzymes contain ~250-300 residues, which encode putative signal sequences and carbohydrate attachment sites. In addition, the N- and C-termini are predominantly hydrophobic, a characteristic of GPI-anchored proteins.

== Structural studies ==
As of late 2007, 6 structures have been solved for this class of enzymes, with PDB accession codes 1GXY, 1GXZ, 1GY0, 1OG1, 1OG3, and 1OG4.
