= EEF2 =

Protein-coding gene in the species Homo sapiens

Identifiers
- Aliases: EEF2, EEF-2, EF-2, EF2, SCA26, eukaryotic translation elongation factor 2, Eukaryotic elongation factor 2
- External IDs: OMIM: 130610; MGI: 95288; GeneCards: EEF2
Available structures
PDB	Ortholog search: PDBe RCSB
PDB	List of PDB id codes 4V6X

Gene location (Human)
Chr.	Chromosome 19 (human)
Band	19p13.3	Start	3,976,056 bp
Band	19p13.3	End	3,985,463 bp

Gene location (Mouse)
Chr.	Chromosome 10 (mouse)
Band	10|10 C1	Start	81,012,465 bp
Band	10|10 C1	End	81,018,332 bp
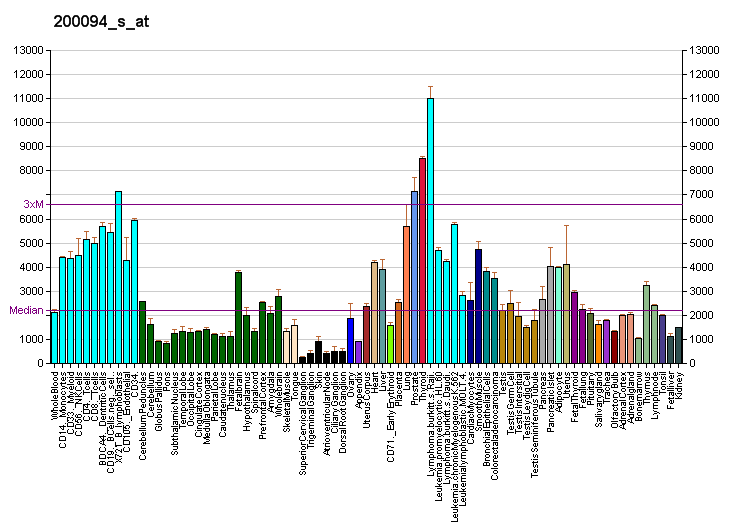

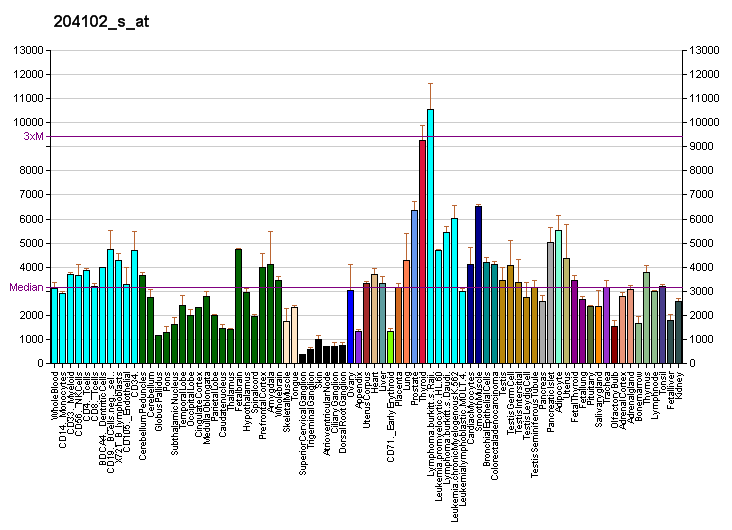
RNA expression pattern
Bgee	Human / Mouse (ortholog); Top expressed in: parotid gland; cartilage tissue; stromal cell of endometrium; external globus pallidus; corpus epididymis; caput epididymis; lateral nuclear group of thalamus; pars reticulata; Achilles tendon; epithelium of colon / Top expressed in: Gonadal ridge; molar; lacrimal gland; transitional epithelium of urinary bladder; maxillary prominence; mandibular prominence; dentate gyrus of hippocampal formation granule cell; somite; ankle; mesenteric lymph nodes; More reference expression data
BioGPS	More reference expression data
Gene ontology
Molecular function	nucleotide binding; ribosome binding; GTP binding; p53 binding; translation elongation factor activity; actin filament binding; protein binding; 5S rRNA binding; protein kinase binding; RNA binding; GTPase activity; cadherin binding
Cellular component	cytoplasm; polysome; membrane; plasma membrane; aggresome; membrane raft; extracellular exosome; nucleus; polysomal ribosome; extracellular matrix; extracellular region; cytosol; secretory granule lumen; ficolin-1-rich granule lumen; synapse; ribonucleoprotein complex
Biological process	response to estradiol; positive regulation of cytoplasmic translation; skeletal muscle contraction; translational elongation; ageing; positive regulation of translation; response to endoplasmic reticulum stress; cellular response to brain-derived neurotrophic factor stimulus; response to ischemia; hematopoietic progenitor cell differentiation; peptidyl-diphthamide biosynthetic process from peptidyl-histidine; glial cell proliferation; skeletal muscle cell differentiation; response to folic acid; response to ethanol; response to hydrogen peroxide; protein biosynthesis; protein methylation; neutrophil degranulation
Sources:Amigo / QuickGO
Orthologs
Databases	NCBI: entry; OMA: entry
Species	Human	Mouse
Entrez	1938	13629
Ensembl	ENSG00000167658	ENSMUSG00000034994
UniProt	P13639	P58252
RefSeq (mRNA)	NM_001961	NM_007907
RefSeq (protein)	NP_001952	NP_031933
Location (UCSC)	Chr 19: 3.98 – 3.99 Mb	Chr 10: 81.01 – 81.02 Mb
PubMed search
- Wikidata
View/Edit Human	View/Edit Mouse

Eukaryotic elongation factor 2 is a protein that in humans is encoded by the EEF2 gene. It is the archaeal and eukaryotic counterpart of bacterial EF-G.

This gene encodes a member of the GTP-binding translation elongation factor family. This protein is an essential factor for protein synthesis. It promotes the GTP-dependent translocation of the ribosome. This protein is completely inactivated by EF-2 kinase phosphorylation.

aEF2/eEF2 found in most archaea and eukaryotes, including humans, contains a post translationally modified histidine diphthamide. It is the target of diphtheria toxin (from Corynebacterium diphtheriae), and exotoxin A (from Pseudomonas aeruginosa). The inactivation of EF-2 by toxins inhibits protein production in the host, causing symptoms due to loss of function in affected cells.
