= Pseudomonas exotoxin =

Exotoxin produced by Pseudomonas aeruginosa

Exotoxin A
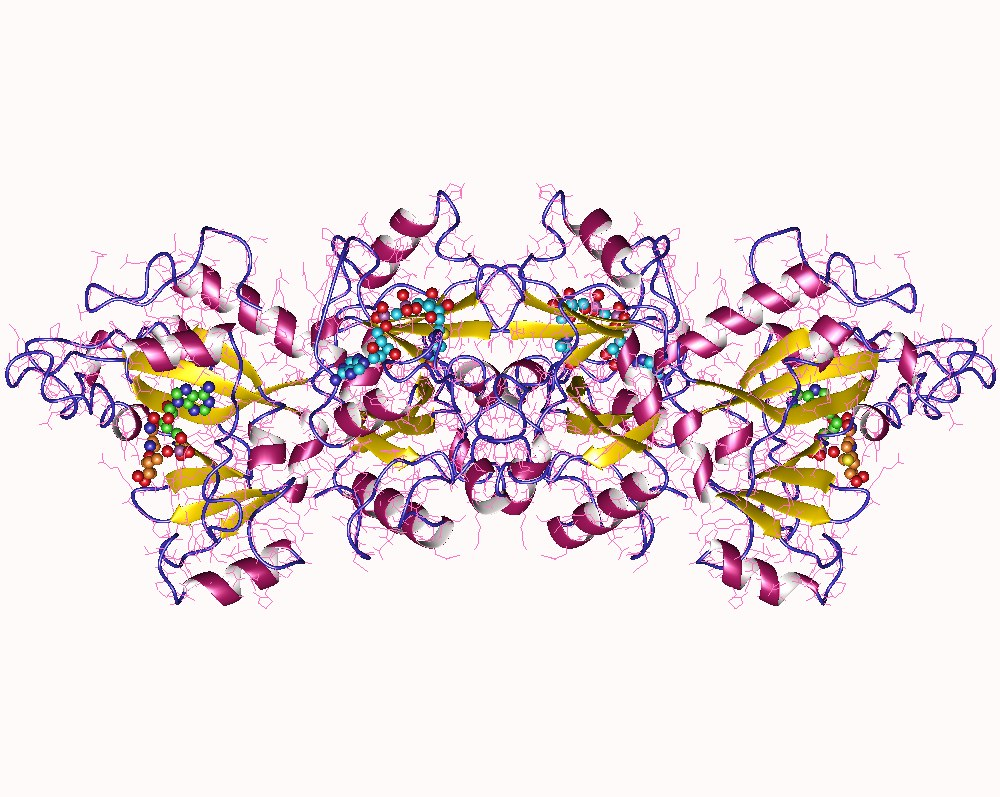
- Exotoxin A dimer, Pseudomonas aeruginosa

Identifiers
- Organism: Pseudomonas aeruginosa
- Symbol: eta
- Orthologs: OMA: entry
- UniProt: P11439

Other data
- EC number: 2.4.2.36
Search for
- Structures: Swiss-model
- Domains: InterPro

The Pseudomonas exotoxin (or exotoxin A) is an exotoxin produced by Pseudomonas aeruginosa. Vibrio cholerae produces a similar protein called the Cholix toxin (Q5EK40).

It inhibits elongation factor-2. It does so by ADP-ribosylation of EF2 using NAD+. This then causes the elongation of polypeptides to cease. This mechanism is similar to that of diphtheria toxin.

It has been investigated as a treatment for hepatitis B and cancer.
