= Diphthamide =

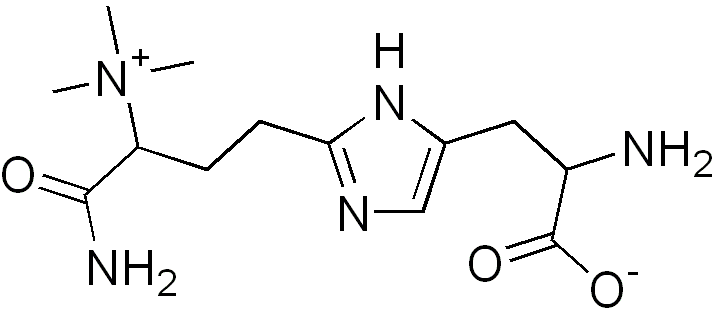

Names
- IUPAC name 2-Amino-3-[2-(3-carbamoyl-3-trimethylammonio-propyl)-3H-imidazol-4-yl]propanoate

Identifiers
CAS Number	75645-22-6
3D model (JSmol)	Interactive image; Interactive image
ChemSpider	4942856
PubChem CID	6438375
UNII	86L3ZZ4408
CompTox Dashboard (EPA)	DTXSID60904010
- InChI: InChI=1S/C13H23N5O3/c1-18(2,3)10(12(15)19)4-5-11-16-7-8(17-11)6-9(14)13(20)21/h7,9-10H,4-6,14H2,1-3H3,(H3-,15,16,17,19,20,21) Key: FOOBQHKMWYGHCE-UHFFFAOYSA-N; InChI=1/C13H23N5O3/c1-18(2,3)10(12(15)19)4-5-11-16-7-8(17-11)6-9(14)13(20)21/h7,9-10H,4-6,14H2,1-3H3,(H3-,15,16,17,19,20,21) Key: FOOBQHKMWYGHCE-UHFFFAOYAN
- SMILES: C[N+](C)(C)C(CCC1=NC=C(N1)CC(C(=O)[O-])N)C(=O)N; [O-]C(=O)C(N)Cc1cnc([nH]1)CCC(C(=O)N)[N+](C)(C)C

Properties
Chemical formula	C_{13}H_{23}N_{5}O_{3}
Molar mass	297.354 g/mol
- Except where otherwise noted, data are given for materials in their standard state (at 25 °C [77 °F], 100 kPa). verify (what is ?) Infobox references

Diphthamide is a post-translationally modified histidine amino acid found in archaeal and eukaryotic elongation factor 2 (eEF-2).

Dipthamide is named after the toxin produced by the bacterium Corynebacterium diphtheriae, which targets diphthamide. Besides this toxin, it is also targeted by exotoxin A from Pseudomonas aeruginosa. It is the only target of these toxins.

== Structure and biosynthesis ==
Diphthamide is proposed to be a 2-[3-carboxyamido-3-(trimethylammonio)propyl]histidine. Though this structure has been confirmed by X-ray crystallography, its stereochemistry is uncertain.

Diphthamide is biosynthesized from histidine and S-adenosyl methionine (SAM). The side chain bound to imidazole group and all methyl groups come from SAM. The whole synthesis takes place in three steps:

- transfer of 3-amino-3-carboxypropyl group from SAM
- transfer of three methyl groups from SAM – synthesis of diphtine
- amidation – synthesis of diphthamide

In eukaryotes, this biosynthetic pathway contains a total of seven genes (Dph1–7).

== Biological function ==
Diphthamide ensures translation fidelity.

The presence or absence of diphthamide is known to affect NF-κB or death receptor pathways.
