= Neuroblast =

Non-dividing precursor cell to a neuron

An embryonic cell that will form into a cell of the nervous system.

In vertebrates, a neuroblast or primitive nerve cell is a postmitotic cell that does not divide further, and which will develop into a neuron after a migration phase. In invertebrates such as Drosophila, neuroblasts are neural progenitor cells which divide asymmetrically to produce a neuroblast, and a daughter cell of varying potency depending on the type of neuroblast. Vertebrate neuroblasts differentiate from radial glial cells and are committed to becoming neurons. Neural stem cells, which only divide symmetrically to produce more neural stem cells, transition gradually into radial glial cells. Radial glial cells, also called radial glial progenitor cells, divide asymmetrically to produce a neuroblast and another radial glial cell that will re-enter the cell cycle.

This mitosis occurs in the germinal neuroepithelium (or germinal zone), when a radial glial cell divides to produce the neuroblast. The neuroblast detaches from the epithelium and migrates while the radial glial progenitor cell produced stays in the lumenal epithelium. The migrating cell will not divide further and this is called the neuron's birthday. Cells with the earliest birthdays will only migrate a short distance. Those cells with later birthdays will migrate further to the more outer regions of the cerebral cortex. The positions that the migrated cells occupy will determine their neuronal differentiation.

== Formation ==
Neuroblasts are formed by the asymmetric division of radial glial cells. They start to migrate as soon as they are born. Neurogenesis can only take place when neural stem cells have transitioned into radial glial cells.

=== Differentiation ===
Neuroblasts are mainly present as precursors of neurons during embryonic development; however, they also constitute one of the cell types involved in adult neurogenesis. Adult neurogenesis is characterized by neural stem cell differentiation and integration in the mature adult mammalian brain. This process occurs in the dentate gyrus of the hippocampus and in the subventricular zones of the adult mammalian brain. Neuroblasts are formed when a neural stem cell, which can differentiate into any type of mature neural cell (i.e. neurons, oligodendrocytes, astrocytes, etc.), divides and becomes a transit amplifying cell. Transit amplifying cells are slightly more differentiated than neural stem cells and can divide asymmetrically to produce postmitotic neuroblasts and glioblasts, as well as other transit amplifying cells. A neuroblast, a daughter cell of a transit amplifying cell, is initially a neural stem cell that has reached the "point of no return." A neuroblast has differentiated such that it will mature into a neuron and not any other neural cell type. Neuroblasts are being studied extensively as they have the potential to be used therapeutically to combat cell loss due to injury or disease in the brain, although their potential effectiveness is debated.

=== Migration ===
In the embryo neuroblasts form the middle mantle layer of the neural tube wall which goes on to form the grey matter of the spinal cord. The outer layer to the mantle layer is the marginal layer and this contains the myelinated axons from the neuroblasts forming the white matter of the spinal cord. The inner layer is the ependymal layer that will form the lining of the ventricles and central canal of the spinal cord.

In humans, neuroblasts produced by stem cells in the adult subventricular zone migrate into damaged areas after brain injuries. However, they are restricted to the subtype of small interneuron-like cells, and it is unlikely that they contribute to functional recovery of striatal circuits.

== Clinical significance ==
There are several disorders known as neuronal migration disorders that can cause serious problems. These arise from a disruption in the pattern of migration of the neuroblasts on their way to their target destinations. The disorders include, lissencephaly, microlissencephaly, pachygyria, and several types of gray matter heterotopia.

== Neuroblast development in Drosophila ==
In the fruit fly model organism Drosophila melanogaster, a neuroblast is a neural progenitor cell which divides asymmetrically to produce a neuroblast and either a neuron, a ganglion mother cell (GMC), or an intermediate neural progenitor, depending on the type of neuroblast. During embryogenesis, embryonic neuroblasts delaminate from either the procephalic neuroectoderm (for brain neuroblasts), or the ventral nerve cord neuroectoderm (for abdominal neuroblasts). During larval development, optic lobe neuroblasts are generated from a neuroectoderm called the Outer Proliferation Center. There are more than 800 optic lobe neuroblasts, 105 central brain neuroblasts, and 30 abdominal neuroblasts per hemisegment (a bilateral half of a segment).

Neuroblasts undergo three known division types. Type 0 neuroblasts divide to give rise to a neuroblast, and a daughter cell which directly differentiates into a single neuron or glia. Type I neuroblasts give rise to a neuroblast and a ganglion mother cell (GMC), which undergoes a terminal division to generate a pair of sibling neurons. This is the most common form of cell division, and is observed in abdominal, optic lobe, and central brain neuroblasts. Type II neuroblasts give rise to a neuroblast and a transit amplifying Intermediate Neural Progenitor (INP). INPs divide in a manner similar to type I neuroblasts, producing an INP and a ganglion mother cell. While only 8 type II neuroblasts exist in the central brain, their lineages are both much larger and more complex than type I neuroblasts. The switch from pluripotent neuroblast to differentiated cell fate is facilitated by the proteins Prospero, Numb, and Miranda. Prospero is a transcription factor that triggers differentiation. It is expressed in neuroblasts, but is kept out of the nucleus by Miranda, which tethers it to the cell's basal cortex. This also results in asymmetric division, where Prospero localizes in only one out of the two daughter cells. After division, Prospero enters the nucleus, and the cell it is present in becomes the GMC.

Neuroblasts are capable of giving rise to the vast neural diversity present in the fly brain using a combination of spatial and temporal restriction of gene expression that give progeny born from each neuroblast a unique identity depending both their parent neuroblast and their birth date. This is partly based on the position of the neuroblast along the Anterior/Posterior and Dorsal/Ventral axes, and partly on a temporal sequence of transcription factors that are expressed in a specific order as neuroblasts undergo sequential divisions.

== See also ==
- Neuroblastoma
- Posterior column
- List of human cell types derived from the germ layers
