= DPYSL5 =

Protein-coding gene in humans

Identifiers
- Aliases: DPYSL5, CRAM, CRMP-5, CRMP5, Ulip6, dihydropyrimidinase like 5, CV2, RTSC4
- External IDs: OMIM: 608383; MGI: 1929772; GeneCards: DPYSL5
Available structures
PDB	Ortholog search: PDBe RCSB
PDB	List of PDB id codes 4B90, 4B91, 4B92

Gene location (Human)
Chr.	Chromosome 2 (human)
Band	2p23.3	Start	26,847,747 bp
Band	2p23.3	End	26,950,351 bp

Gene location (Mouse)
Chr.	Chromosome 5 (mouse)
Band	5|5 B1	Start	30,868,908 bp
Band	5|5 B1	End	30,956,719 bp
RNA expression pattern
Bgee	Human / Mouse (ortholog); Top expressed in: ganglionic eminence; ventricular zone; C1 segment; nucleus accumbens; putamen; substantia nigra; caudate nucleus; corpus callosum; hypothalamus; inferior ganglion of vagus nerve / Top expressed in: tail of embryo; ganglionic eminence; ventricular zone; lumbar spinal ganglion; neural layer of retina; Rostral migratory stream; superior cervical ganglion; genital tubercle; epiblast; seminiferous tubule; More reference expression data
BioGPS	n/a
Gene ontology
Molecular function	microtubule binding; protein binding; hydrolase activity; hydrolase activity, acting on carbon-nitrogen (but not peptide) bonds; dihydropyrimidinase activity
Cellular component	cytoplasm; cytosol; soma; dendrite
Biological process	signal transduction; nervous system development; axon guidance; pyrimidine nucleobase catabolic process
Sources:Amigo / QuickGO
Orthologs
Databases	NCBI: entry; OMA: entry
Species	Human	Mouse
Entrez	56896	65254
Ensembl	ENSG00000157851	ENSMUSG00000029168
UniProt	Q9BPU6	Q9EQF6
RefSeq (mRNA)	NM_020134; NM_001253723; NM_001253724	NM_023047; NM_001356948; NM_001356949
RefSeq (protein)	NP_001240652; NP_001240653; NP_064519	NP_075534; NP_001343877; NP_001343878
Location (UCSC)	Chr 2: 26.85 – 26.95 Mb	Chr 5: 30.87 – 30.96 Mb
PubMed search
- Wikidata
View/Edit Human	View/Edit Mouse

Dihydropyrimidinase-related protein 5 is an enzyme that in humans is encoded by the DPYSL5 gene.

Members of the CRMP family, such as DPYSL5, are believed to play a role in growth cone guidance during neural development.[supplied by OMIM]
