= Adaptor-related protein complex 2, alpha 1 =

Protein found in humans

AP2A1
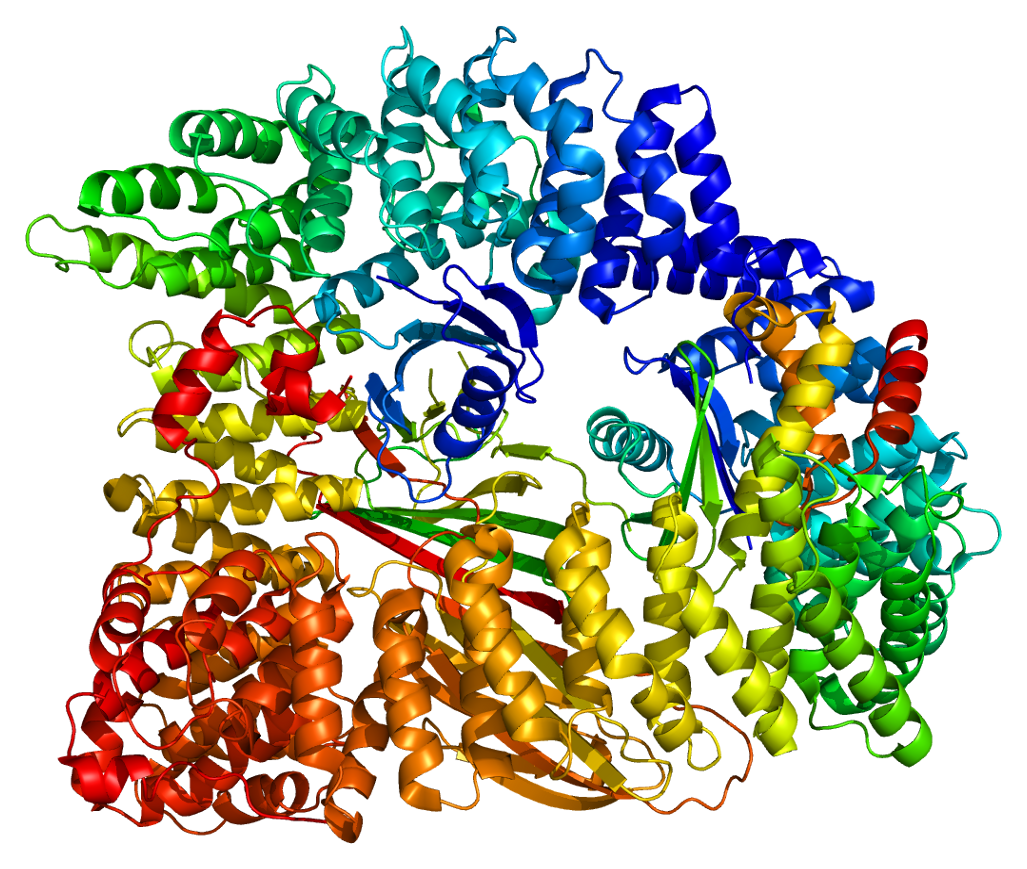

Identifiers
- Aliases: AP2A1, ADTAA, AP2-ALPHA, CLAPA1, Adaptor-related protein complex 2, alpha 1, adaptor related protein complex 2 alpha 1 subunit, adaptor related protein complex 2 subunit alpha 1
- External IDs: OMIM: 601026; MGI: 101921; GeneCards: AP2A1

Gene location (Human)
Chr.	Chromosome 19 (human)
Band	19q13.33	Start	49,767,001 bp
Band	19q13.33	End	49,807,114 bp

Gene location (Mouse)
Chr.	Chromosome 7 (mouse)
Band	7|7 B3	Start	44,549,797 bp
Band	7|7 B3	End	44,578,920 bp
RNA expression pattern
Bgee	Human / Mouse (ortholog); Top expressed in: right adrenal gland; right adrenal cortex; left adrenal gland; left adrenal cortex; left testis; right testis; right hemisphere of cerebellum; right frontal lobe; Brodmann area 9; right ovary / Top expressed in: superior frontal gyrus; spermatid; primary visual cortex; dentate gyrus of hippocampal formation granule cell; spermatocyte; muscle of thigh; neural layer of retina; lip; cerebellar cortex; ventricular zone; More reference expression data
BioGPS	n/a
Gene ontology
Molecular function	protein C-terminus binding; clathrin adaptor activity; protein-containing complex binding; protein binding; protein kinase binding; low-density lipoprotein particle receptor binding
Cellular component	endocytic vesicle membrane; cytosol; filopodium tip; membrane coat; apical plasma membrane; endolysosome membrane; clathrin adaptor complex; basolateral plasma membrane; clathrin-coated pit; clathrin coat of trans-Golgi network vesicle; clathrin-coated endocytic vesicle membrane; AP-2 adaptor complex; membrane; plasma membrane; clathrin-coated vesicle; protein-containing complex; clathrin-coated endocytic vesicle
Biological process	ephrin receptor signaling pathway; mitigation of host defenses by virus; clathrin-dependent endocytosis; antigen processing and presentation of exogenous peptide antigen via MHC class II; Golgi to endosome transport; transport; protein transport; vesicle-mediated transport; intracellular protein transport; endocytosis; microtubule-based movement; Wnt signaling pathway, planar cell polarity pathway; negative regulation of hyaluronan biosynthetic process; membrane organization; low-density lipoprotein particle receptor catabolic process; low-density lipoprotein particle clearance; positive regulation of neuron projection development; positive regulation of receptor-mediated endocytosis
Sources:Amigo / QuickGO
Orthologs
Databases	NCBI: entry; OMA: entry
Species	Human	Mouse
Entrez	160	11771
Ensembl	ENSG00000196961	ENSMUSG00000060279
UniProt	O95782	P17426
RefSeq (mRNA)	NM_014203; NM_130787	NM_001077264; NM_007458
RefSeq (protein)	NP_055018; NP_570603	NP_001070732; NP_031484
Location (UCSC)	Chr 19: 49.77 – 49.81 Mb	Chr 7: 44.55 – 44.58 Mb
PubMed search
- Wikidata
View/Edit Human	View/Edit Mouse

AP-2 complex subunit alpha-1 is a protein that in humans is encoded by the AP2A1 gene.

This gene encodes the alpha 1 adaptin subunit of the adaptor protein 2 (AP2 adaptors) complex found in clathrin coated vesicles. The AP-2 complex is a heterotetramer consisting of two large adaptins (alpha or beta), a medium adaptin (mu), and a small adaptin (sigma). The complex is part of the protein coat on the cytoplasmic face of coated vesicles which links clathrin to receptors in vesicles. Alternative splicing of this gene results in two transcript variants encoding two different isoforms. A third transcript variant has been described, but its full length nature has not been determined.

== Interactions ==
Adaptor-related protein complex 2, alpha 1 has been shown to interact with DPYSL2 and NUMB.
