= CRMP1 =

Protein-coding gene in the species Homo sapiens

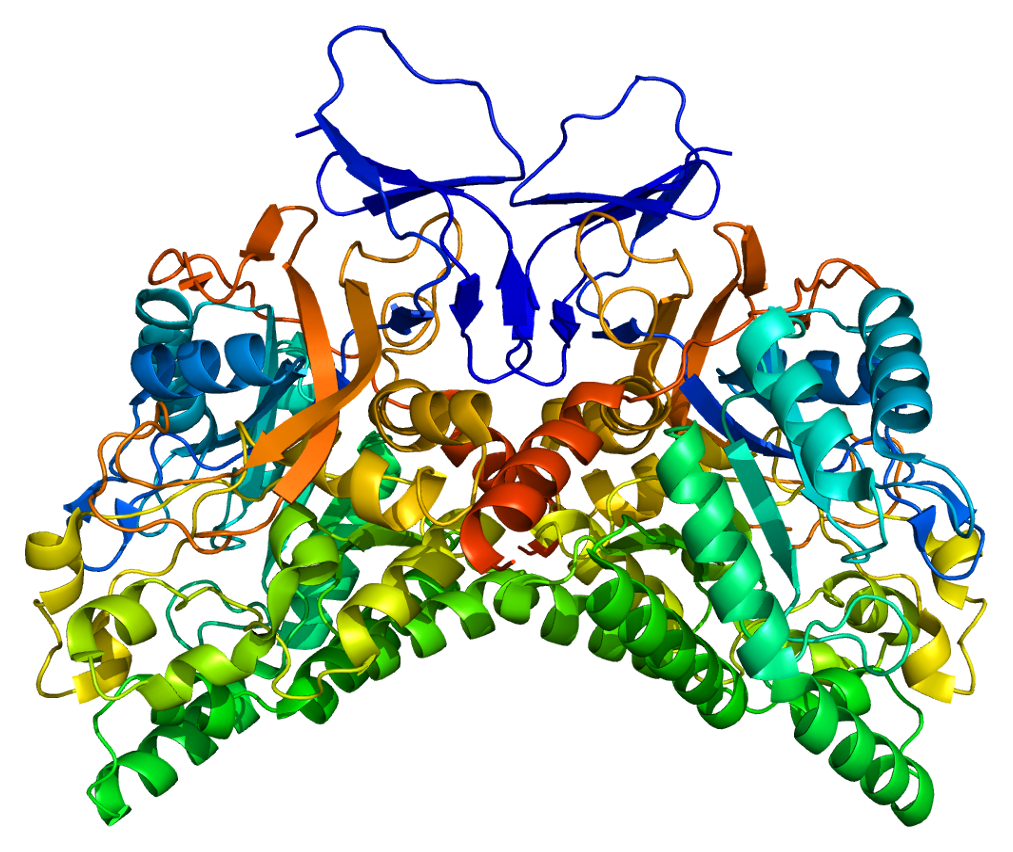

Identifiers
- Aliases: CRMP1, CRMP-1, DPYSL1, DRP-1, DRP1, ULIP-3, collapsin response mediator protein 1
- External IDs: OMIM: 602462; MGI: 107793; GeneCards: CRMP1
Available structures
PDB	Ortholog search: PDBe RCSB
PDB	List of PDB id codes 4B3Z

Gene location (Human)
Chr.	Chromosome 4 (human)
Band	4p16.2	Start	5,748,084 bp
Band	4p16.2	End	5,893,086 bp

Gene location (Mouse)
Chr.	Chromosome 5 (mouse)
Band	5 B3|5 19.96 cM	Start	37,399,284 bp
Band	5 B3|5 19.96 cM	End	37,449,477 bp
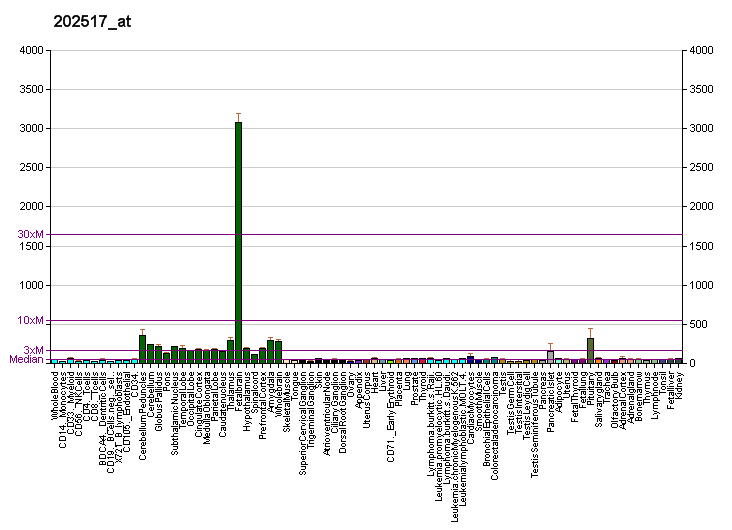
RNA expression pattern
Bgee	Human / Mouse (ortholog); Top expressed in: ganglionic eminence; ventricular zone; lateral nuclear group of thalamus; right hemisphere of cerebellum; middle temporal gyrus; prefrontal cortex; dorsolateral prefrontal cortex; right frontal lobe; paraflocculus of cerebellum; anterior pituitary / Top expressed in: ganglionic eminence; superior cervical ganglion; barrel cortex; olfactory bulb; entorhinal cortex; CA3 field; perirhinal cortex; dentate gyrus of hippocampal formation granule cell; medial ganglionic eminence; neural tube; More reference expression data
BioGPS	More reference expression data
Gene ontology
Molecular function	protein binding; hydrolase activity; hydrolase activity, acting on carbon-nitrogen (but not peptide) bonds; filamin binding
Cellular component	spindle; cytoskeleton; microtubule organizing center; cytoplasm; cytosol; midbody; centrosome; nucleus
Biological process	neuron development; nucleobase-containing compound metabolic process; microtubule cytoskeleton organization; nervous system development; axon guidance; negative regulation of actin filament binding; negative regulation of neuron projection development
Sources:Amigo / QuickGO
Orthologs
Databases	NCBI: entry; OMA: entry
Species	Human	Mouse
Entrez	1400	12933
Ensembl	ENSG00000072832	ENSMUSG00000029121
UniProt	Q14194	P97427
RefSeq (mRNA)	NM_001313; NM_001014809; NM_001288661; NM_001288662	NM_001136058; NM_007765
RefSeq (protein)	NP_001014809; NP_001275590; NP_001275591; NP_001304	NP_001129530; NP_031791
Location (UCSC)	Chr 4: 5.75 – 5.89 Mb	Chr 5: 37.4 – 37.45 Mb
PubMed search
- Wikidata
View/Edit Human	View/Edit Mouse

Collapsin response mediator protein 1, encoded by the CRMP1 gene, is a human protein of the CRMP family.

This gene encodes a member of a family of cytosolic phosphoproteins expressed exclusively in the nervous system. The encoded protein is thought to be a part of the semaphorin signal transduction pathway implicated in semaphorin-induced growth cone collapse during neural development. Alternative splicing results in multiple transcript variants.

CRMP1 mediates reelin signaling in cortical neuronal migration. Mice deficient in CRMP1 exhibit impaired long-term potentiation and impaired spatial learning and memory.

CRMP1 gene overlaps with another gene called EVC.

== Interactions ==
CRMP1 has been shown to interact with DPYSL2.
