= Neurite =

Projection from the cell body of a neuron

A neurite or neuronal process refers to any projection from the cell body of a neuron. This projection can be either an axon or a dendrite. The term is frequently used when speaking of immature or developing neurons, especially of cells in culture, because it can be difficult to tell axons from dendrites before differentiation is complete.

== Neurite development ==
The development of a neurite (neuritogenesis) requires a complex interplay of both extracellular and intracellular signals. At every given point along a developing neurite, there are receptors detecting both positive and negative growth cues from every direction in the surrounding space. The developing neurite sums together all of these growth signals in order to determine which direction the neurite will ultimately grow towards. While not all of the growth signals are known, several have been identified and characterized. Among the known extracellular growth signals are netrin, a midline chemoattractant, and semaphorin, ephrin and collapsin, all inhibitors of neurite growth.

Young neurites are often packed with microtubule bundles, the growth of which is stimulated by neurotrophic factors, such as nerve growth factor (NGF). Tau proteins can aid in the stabilization of microtubules by binding to the microtubules, protecting them from microtubule severing proteins. Even after the microtubules have stabilized, the cytoskeleton of the neuron remains dynamic. Actin filaments retain their dynamic properties in the neurite that will become the axon in order to push the microtubules bundles outward to extend the axon. In all other neurites however, the actin filaments are stabilized by myosin. This prevents the development of multiple axons.

The neural cell adhesion molecule N-CAM simultaneously combines with another N-CAM and a fibroblast growth factor receptor to stimulate the tyrosine kinase activity of that receptor to induce the growth of neurites.

There are several software kits available to facilitate neurite tracing in images such as NeuronJ (an ImageJ plugin), Neuromantic, and the Neurolucida system.

Weak endogenous electric fields may be used to both facilitate and direct the growth of projections from cell soma neurites, EFs of moderate strength have been used to direct and enhance neurite outgrowth in both murine, or mouse, and xenopus models. Co-culture of neurons with electrically aligned glial tissue also directs neurite outgrowth, as it is rich in neurotrophins that promote nerve growth.

== Establishing polarity ==
=== In vitro ===
Dorsal root ganglion neurons (left) extend neurites in a microfluidic device (time lapse over 48 hours).

An undifferentiated mammalian neuron placed in culture will retract any neurites that it has already grown. 0.5 to 1.5 days after being plated in culture, several minor neurites will begin to protrude out from the cell body. Sometime between day 1.5 and day 3, one of the minor neurites begins to outgrow the other neurites significantly. This neurite will eventually become the axon. On days 4 to 7, the remaining minor neurites will begin differentiating into dendrites. By day 7, the neuron should be completely polarized, with a functional dendrites and an axon.

=== In vivo ===
A neurite growing in vivo is surrounded by thousands of extracellular signals which in turn can be modulated by hundreds of intracellular pathways, and the mechanisms for how these competing chemical signals effect the ultimate differentiation of neurites in vivo is not precisely understood. It is known that 60% of the time the first neurite that protrudes from the cell body will become the axon. 30% of the time, a neurite not destined to become the axon protrudes from the cell body first. 10% of the time, the neurite that will become the axon protrudes from the cell body simultaneously with one or more other neurites. It has been proposed that a minor neurite could extend outward until it touches an already developed axon of another neuron. At this point, the neurite will begin to differentiate into an axon. This is known as the "touch and go" model. However, this model does not explain how the first axon developed.

Whatever extracellular signals may be involved in inducing axon formation are transduced through at least 4 different pathways: the Rac-1 pathway, the Ras-mediated pathway, the cAMP-liver kinase B1 pathway, and the calcium/calmodulin-dependent protein kinase pathway. A deficiency in any of these pathways would lead to the inability to develop a neuron.

After forming one axon, the neuron must prevent all other neurites from becoming axons as well. This is known as global inhibition. It has been suggested that global inhibition is achieved by a long-range negative feedback signal released from the developed axon and taken up by the other neurite. However, no long range signaling molecule has been discovered. Alternatively, it has been suggested that the buildup of axonal growth factors in the neurite destined to become the axon means there is a depletion of axonal growth factors by default, as they must compete for the same proteins. This causes the other neurites to develop into dendrites as they lack sufficient concentrations of axonal growth factors to become axons. This would allow for a mechanism of global inhibition without the need for a long range signaling molecule.

== See also ==
- Lewy neurites
- Unipolar neuron
