= NUMB (gene) =

Protein-coding gene in the species Homo sapiens

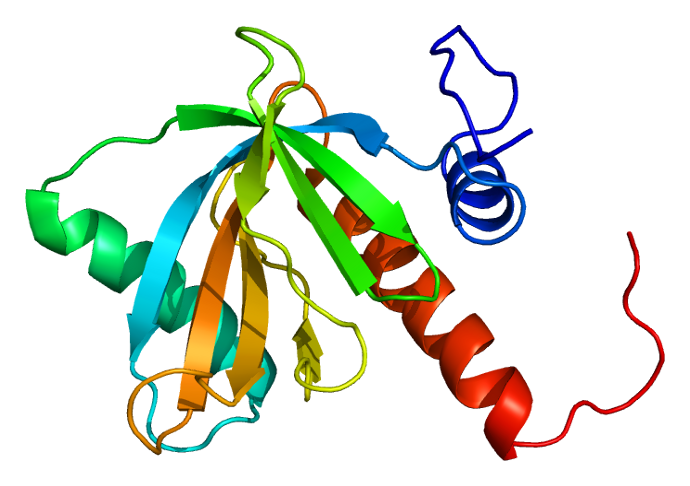
Available structures
PDB	Ortholog search: PDBe RCSB
PDB	List of PDB id codes 1WJ1

Identifiers
- Aliases: NUMB, C14orf41, S171, c14_5527, endocytic adaptor protein, NUMB endocytic adaptor protein
- External IDs: OMIM: 603728; MGI: 107423; HomoloGene: 2775; GeneCards: NUMB; OMA:NUMB - orthologs

Gene location (Human)
Chr.	Chromosome 14 (human)
Band	14q24.2-q24.3	Start	73,275,107 bp
Band	14q24.2-q24.3	End	73,458,617 bp

Gene location (Mouse)
Chr.	Chromosome 12 (mouse)
Band	12|12 D1	Start	83,840,808 bp
Band	12|12 D1	End	83,968,708 bp
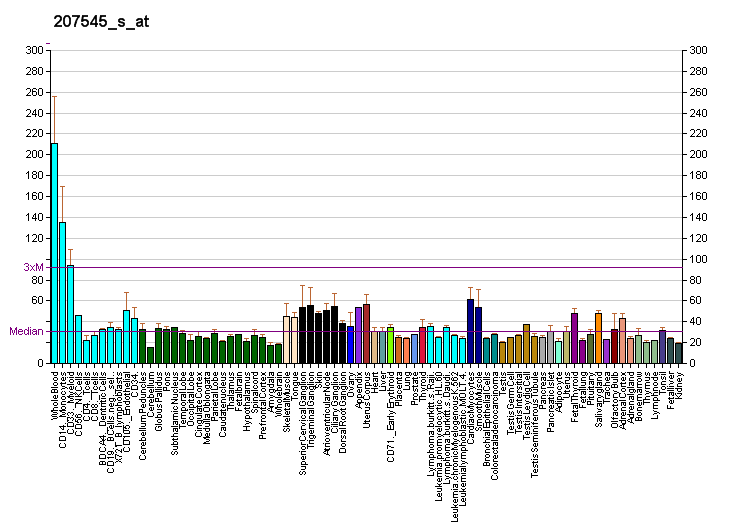

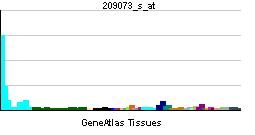
RNA expression pattern
Bgee	Human / Mouse (ortholog); Top expressed in: monocyte; epithelium of colon; right lung; blood; gallbladder; right uterine tube; stromal cell of endometrium; rectum; oocyte; sural nerve / Top expressed in: medullary collecting duct; vestibular membrane of cochlear duct; conjunctival fornix; granulocyte; Epithelium of choroid plexus; hair follicle; right lung; saccule; left lung; right lung lobe; More reference expression data
BioGPS	More reference expression data
Gene ontology
Molecular function	beta-catenin binding; protein binding; alpha-catenin binding; cadherin binding
Cellular component	cytoplasm; membrane; focal adhesion; plasma membrane; apical part of cell; basolateral plasma membrane; early endosome; extrinsic component of plasma membrane; nucleus; clathrin-coated vesicle; cytoplasmic vesicle; glutamatergic synapse
Biological process	neuroblast division in subventricular zone; lateral ventricle development; axonogenesis; positive regulation of cell migration; nervous system development; multicellular organism development; positive regulation of neurogenesis; negative regulation of protein localization to plasma membrane; neuroblast proliferation; lung epithelial cell differentiation; positive regulation of polarized epithelial cell differentiation; forebrain development; adherens junction organization; negative regulation of Notch signaling pathway; regulation of postsynaptic neurotransmitter receptor internalization
Sources:Amigo / QuickGO
Orthologs
Species	Human	Mouse
Entrez	8650	18222
Ensembl	ENSG00000133961	ENSMUSG00000021224
UniProt	P49757	Q9QZS3
RefSeq (mRNA)	NM_001005743; NM_001005744; NM_001005745; NM_003744; NM_001320114	NM_001136075; NM_001272055; NM_001272056; NM_010949
RefSeq (protein)	NP_001005743; NP_001005744; NP_001005745; NP_001307043; NP_003735	NP_001129547; NP_001258984; NP_001258985; NP_035079
Location (UCSC)	Chr 14: 73.28 – 73.46 Mb	Chr 12: 83.84 – 83.97 Mb
PubMed search
- Wikidata
View/Edit Human	View/Edit Mouse

Protein numb homolog is a protein that in humans is encoded by the NUMB gene. The protein encoded by this gene plays a role in the determination of cell fates during development. The encoded protein, whose degradation is induced in a proteasome-dependent manner by MDM2, is a membrane-bound protein that has been shown to associate with EPS15, LNX1, and NOTCH1. Four transcript variants encoding different isoforms have been found for this gene.

The protein Numb is coded for by the gene, NUMB, whose mechanism appears to be evolutionarily conserved. Numb has been extensively studied in both invertebrates and mammals, though its function is best understood in Drosophila. Numb plays a crucial role in asymmetrical cell division during development, allowing for differential cell fate specification in the central and peripheral nervous systems. During neurogenesis, Numb localizes to one side of the mother cell such that it is distributed selectively to one daughter cell. This asymmetric division allows a daughter cell containing Numb to acquire a different fate than the other daughter cell.

== Gene ==
The numb gene protein product controls binary cell fate decisions in the peripheral and central nervous systems of both invertebrates and mammals during neurogenesis. During cell division, Numb is asymmetrically localized to one end of the progenitor cell and subsequently segregates to only one daughter cell where it intrinsically determines cell fate. Numb protein signaling plays a key role in binary cell fate decisions following asymmetric cell divisions. One daughter cell, generally that receiving the Numb, is able to adopt a neuronal fate and innervate the developing nervous system. The other daughter cell becomes a progenitor cell to fill the lost role of the parent cell and maintain proliferation. In addition to its role in proliferation and differentiation, Numb has also been shown to play a role in tumorigenesis and the response of neural progenitors to chemotactic cues during migration.

In mammals, there are four alternatively spliced forms of the Numb protein. In addition, there is a Numb homolog called “Numb-like,” or NUMBL. Numb proteins in mammals are not as well understood as their fly counterparts. The various forms of Numb have differential progenitor-promoting and differentiation-promoting functions. More research is necessary to understand the complex relationships between these forms of Numb and their functions.

== Asymmetic localization ==
In both invertebrates and mammals, Numb is localized using the Pins/GαI complex and the PAR complex of Bazooka (Par3 in mammals), Par6, and aPKC (atypical protein kinase C). In the sensory organ precursor (SOP) cell, the PAR proteins localize to the posterior pole of the cell, and the Pins/GαI complex is localized to the anterior pole of the cell. This results in an anterior/posterior cell division with daughter cells of similar size. In neuroblasts, both complexes are localized to the apical cortex, causing apical/basal cell division and daughter cells exhibiting strong size asymmetry. In the SOP, one mechanism for Numb localization has been proposed based on the PAR complex. It states that a complex phosphorylation cascade enables aPKC to phosphorylate Numb in the pre-mitotic cell, decreasing its affinity for the plasma membrane. This releases Numb from the aPKC pole, increasing its presence in the non-aPKC pole. This establishes the asymmetric distribution of Numb, with the Numb/Pon crescent on one side of the mother cell.

Another proposed component of the localization complex is Partner of Numb (PON), which is asymmetrically localized during mitosis and acts as an adaptor protein by binding and mediating the anchoring of Numb. The localization of PON is controlled by either Insc or the Frizzled-Wnt signaling pathway.

== Role in cell proliferation and differentiation ==
=== Differentiation through inhibition of notch signaling ===
Numb's primary function in cell differentiation is as an inhibitor of Notch signaling which is essential for maintaining self-renewal potential in stem and progenitor cells. Notch is a transmembrane signaling receptor that is activated by DSL family ligands. Notch binds the ligands Delta and Serrate in Drosophila. The human ligands are Delta-like and Jagged, respectively. These ligands are themselves integral membrane proteins. Following ligand binding of the Notch receptor, the intracellular fragment of Notch (NICD, or notch intracellular domain) is released into the cytoplasm and transported to the nucleus, where it can form a complex with binding partners such as EP300 and histone acetyltransferase and act as a transcription factor for Notch target genes. Among the Notch target genes are members of the HES and HEY gene families whose protein products can act as transcriptional repressors for tissue-specific transcription factors, thus maintaining the cell's potential for self-renewal.

=== Inhibition of notch signaling through the ubiquitination pathway ===
Numb exerts its functional role on cell fate decisions by antagonizing Notch signaling activities. The molecular mechanisms underlying this relationship appear to rely on the ubiquitination of the membrane bound Notch1 receptor and the subsequent degradation of its NICD following receptor activation. In support of this, Numb's ability to ubiquinate Notch1 directly correlated with its functional inhibition of Notch1 signaling activities. The ubiquitination pathway directs protein recycling by directly tagging specific proteins for proteasome degradation. Through a multi-step process, free ubiquitin is first attached to an activating enzyme (E1) and then transferred to a conjugating enzyme (E2) which partners with a ligase (E3) which functions as an adaptor to selectively transfer the ubiquitin to specific protein substrates. Numb expression was found to selectively tag the membrane Notch1 receptor for ubiquitination through the interaction of its Phosphotyrosine-binding domain with the E3 ubiquitin ligase Itch. Numb and Itch work in concert to promote the ubiquitination of the full-length membrane-tethered Notch receptor prior to activation. However, Numb only appears to promote the degradation of the NICD cleavage product following receptor activation, targeting it for proteasome degradation and preventing its translocation to the nucleus.

=== Inhibition of notch signaling through sanpodo ===
Numb acts as an antagonist for Notch by causing its selective endocytosis and degradation. Another mechanism proposed for how this is accomplished in Drosophila involves a protein called Sanpodo. Sanpodo is a protein that associates with both Notch and Numb. It is located at the plasma membrane and is necessary for Notch activation, promoting Notch cleavage and NICD signaling in the nucleus. Numb converts Sanpodo from an activator to an inhibitor of Notch signaling, magnifying the differences in Notch signaling between different daughter cells. In daughter cells containing Numb, Sanpodo allows Numb to inhibit Notch. In daughter cells with no Numb, Sanpodo potentiates Notch signaling. Sanpodo therefore allows cells to maintain Notch signaling at a below- or above-threshold level.

== Numb in Drosophila ==
Numb has been studied most extensively in Drosophila, in particular in the context of their sensory organ precursors and ganglion mother cells.

=== External sensory organ development ===
The Drosophila external sensory organ is a sensory structure in the peripheral nervous system that consists of four cells; a neuron, a sheath cell that surrounds the dendrite, and hair and socket cells, which are considered the “outer” support cells. All four cell fates are descendants of the sensory organ precursor (SOP) cell. In response to the proper cues, SOPs first divide into two secondary precursor cells. The posterior daughter cell is called the pIIa cell and the anterior daughter cell is called the pIIb. The pIIa cell divides to produce a bristle cell and a socket cell, while the pIIb cell divides to produce a neuron and a glial cell. The asymmetric division of the SOP into daughter cells with distinct fates is dependent upon the distribution of Numb. Numb is distributed uniformly in the cytoplasm until mitotic division, when it is selectively localized to the anterior pole of the cell. Thus, Numb is selectively segregated into the pIIb daughter cell upon division of the SOP.

Loss of Numb function causes inappropriate differentiation of SOP cells into all pIIa cells, producing four outer support cells and no neurons or glia. In SOP loss of function Numb mutants, flies have a significant decrease in sensory neurons, leaving them “numb.” Gain of function Notch mutants express a similar phenotype. Ectopic expression of Numb during SOP division has the opposite effect, producing all pIIb cells and no outer support cells. In support of previous experiments demonstrating the role of Numb in Notch signaling inhibition, functional loss of Notch signaling components result in SOP division into two pIIb cells, suggesting Numb promotes acquisition of the pIIb cell fate through inhibition of Notch signaling. Thus, the asymmetric distribution of Numb into IIb secondary precursors during SOP division is necessary for daughter cells to acquire distinct cell fates.

=== Ganglion mother cell ===
A ganglion mother cell (GMC) is the cell derived from the division of a neuroblast in the Drosophila central nervous system. The neuroblast divides to produce two cells, a progenitor cell like the mother neuroblast and a GMC that will divide to produce neurons. The mother neuroblast divides along the apical-basal axis, with Numb localizing basally and ending up in the GMC.

== Numb in mammals ==
=== Alternative splicing to support proliferation and differentiation ===
In mice embryos mutant for Numb, early neurons emerge in the expected spatial and temporal pattern but fail to maintain a sufficient pool of proliferating progenitors and nearly deplete the population of dividing cells shortly after the onset of neurogenesis. These embryos display precocious neuron production in the forebrain and defects in neural tube closure, dying around embryonic day 11.5. These studies suggest a functional role of mammalian Numb in promoting progenitor cell fate during neurogenesis, which directly opposes the proposed role of Numb in invertebrates. However, other studies have shown overexpression of Numb in the mammalian neural crest MONC-1 stem cell line biases neuronal differentiation, consistent with what is observed in drosophila.

Unlike the invertebrate Numb gene, the mammalian Numb gene undergoes alternative splicing to produce at least four functionally different Numb isoforms. While asymmetric divisions alone can produce sufficient neuron populations in Drosophila, mammalian brains are much more advanced and require larger populations of neurons that can't be established to asymmetric divisions alone. Thus, mammalian cortical progenitors must first need to undergo symmetric divisions to expand the progenitor pool before they can undergo later asymmetric divisions for neuronal generations. The mammalian brain has accounted for this by producing isoforms of Numb that maintain progenitor populations in addition to those which support neuronal differentiation.

Studies using the mouse embryonic P19 cell line have shown isoforms with the short proline rich region (PRR) domain promote neuronal differentiation, while those with the long PRR domain promote cell proliferation and prevent differentiation. The p71 and p72 isoforms, which contain the PRR insert, are primarily expressed in actively dividing tissues and are down regulated during differentiation suggesting these isoforms promote cell proliferation (Dho et al., 1999). In contrast, the Drosophila Numb gene encodes a 66 kDa protein. Consistent with the finding that Numb only supports differentiation and not proliferation in asymmetric division, the 66 kDa Drosophila protein is analogous to a shorter mammalian isoform lacking the PRR insert and thus promoting cell differentiation.

== Role in cancer and tumorigenesis ==
In several types of cancer, a loss of Numb expression has been demonstrated. This is well-established in breast cancer, where a loss of Numb correlates with a worse prognosis. Numb loss has also been demonstrated in Non-small-cell lung carcinoma, salivary gland carcinoma, and chronic myelogenous leukemia. Restoration of Numb function, or manipulation of enzymes in the ubiquitin mechanism, are some possible research directions for the treatment of certain cancer types.

=== Role in mammary carcinomas ===
In approximately half of all human mammary carcinomas, Numb-mediated suppression of Notch signaling is lost due to Numb ubiquitination, tagging it for proteasomal degradation. Numb acts as an oncogene suppressor, inhibiting tumor cell proliferation through suppression of Notch signaling. Increased Notch signaling is observed in tumors where Numb activity has been lost and retrovirally mediated transient overexpression of Numb protein in these tumors restored basal levels of Notch signaling and significantly reduced their colony-forming abilities. Thus, the biological antagonism between Notch and Numb signaling that controls the proliferative/differentiative balance of many cell lineages appears to play a role in human breast carcinogenesis and perhaps other types of tumorigenesis. Pharmacological inhibition of Notch signaling or enhancement of Numb signaling could be a source of treatment for cancer patients in the future.

Numb has been posited to have a role in tumor-suppression, through its ability to regulate Notch and TP53. Numb binds and inhibits the E3-ligase Mdm2 that is responsible for TP53 ubiquitination and degradation. The ablation of Numb in a cell leads to a decrease in TP53, causing impaired apoptosis and cell cycle checkpoint response. Restoring Numb levels also restores TP53 expression and tumor suppressant abilities.

== Role in cell migration ==
Neural precursors are generated in proliferative zones, before migrating to directed locations where they undergo maturation and become functional neurons. Studies in Drosophila first suggested Numb played a role in cell migration when mutants displayed defective glial migration along axonal tracts. Since then, a mechanism has been discovered through which Numb binds chemotactic signaling receptors, forming a scaffold for atypical PKC (aPKC) recruitment to the receptor complex. Once activated, aPKC phosphorylates Numb, thus promoting a positive feed-forward response that potentiates Numb-chemotactic receptor binding and subsequent endosomal complex formation. Endocytosis supports the relocalization of the chemotactic receptor to the front of the cell to promote receptor-mediated directional migration in response to receptor activation.

Brain-derived neurotrophic factor is among the chemotactic factors that stimulate Numb-mediated chemotaxis during cell migration. BDNF can function as a chemotactic factor for neural precursors during migration by activating TrkB receptors. Numb binds to TrkB receptors to act as an endocytic regulator of TrkB and promote aPKC activation by acting as a scaffolding protein. Once phosphorylated, aPKC can also phosphorylate Numb to increase its efficacy for binding TrkB, thus promoting the precursor's chemotactic sensitivity to BDNF.

== Interactions ==
Numb has demonstrated protein-protein interactions with adaptor-related protein complex 2, alpha 1, Mdm2, L1, DPYSL2, SIAH1, P53 and LNX1.
