= Virtual Fly Brain =

An interactive tool based on a model of the Drosophila melanogaster brain

Dragram of brain model

Virtual Fly Brain, or VFB, is an interactive, web-based tool used by neurobiologists to explore the detailed neuroanatomy, transgene expression and associated phenotypes of the Drosophila melanogaster brain. Users can browse painted 3D image stacks of the Drosophila brain, choose planes of sections, and click on painted regions to find definitions, references and synonyms for specific components. For each region, they can run queries to find neurons, transgene expression and phenotypes. The underlying anatomy and expression database is maintained by FlyBase. The Virtual Fly Brain project is carried out by researchers at the University of Cambridge and the University of Edinburgh.

== Technical details ==
Virtual Fly Brain uses an ontological model of Drosophila anatomy written in OWL2 and based on the Drosophila literature. This contains detailed information about gross neuroanatomy, neuron classes, and the relationships between them. Underlying each neuroanatomy query is a query of this ontology in OWL-DL.

Queries of phenotype and expression utilise the large volume of expression and phenotype data in FlyBase annotated using the Drosophila anatomy ontology. Each query starts with a query of the anatomy ontology for terms appropriate to the chosen region. The output of this query is then used as input for a query of the FlyBase chado database for expression or phenotype annotated using these terms.

Images in the viewer are delivered as a series of tiles covering only the visible area in the browser window. The tiles are produced from a compound 3D Woolz object representing the overall structure and individual painted domains.

== See also ==
- Insect brain
- Drosophila connectome
- Ganglion mother cell
- Pigment dispersing factor
