= Asymmetric cell division =

Production of two daughter cells with different cellular fates

An asymmetric cell division produces two daughter cells with different cellular fates. This is in contrast to symmetric cell divisions which give rise to daughter cells of equivalent fates. Notably, stem cells divide asymmetrically to give rise to two distinct daughter cells: one copy of the original stem cell as well as a second daughter programmed to differentiate into a non-stem cell fate. (In times of growth or regeneration, stem cells can also divide symmetrically, to produce two identical copies of the original cell.)

In principle, there are two mechanisms by which distinct properties may be conferred on the daughters of a dividing cell. In one, the daughter cells are initially equivalent but a difference is induced by signaling between the cells, from surrounding cells, or from the precursor cell. This mechanism is known as extrinsic asymmetric cell division. In the second mechanism, the prospective daughter cells are inherently different at the time of division of the mother cell. Because this latter mechanism does not depend on interactions of cells with each other or with their environment, it must rely on intrinsic asymmetry. The term asymmetric cell division usually refers to such intrinsic asymmetric divisions.

== Intrinsic asymmetry ==
In order for asymmetric division to take place the mother cell must be polarized, and the mitotic spindle must be aligned with the axis of polarity. The cell biology of these events has been most studied in three animal models: the mouse, the nematode Caenorhabditis elegans, and the fruit fly Drosophila melanogaster. A later focus has been on development in spiralia.

== In C. elegans development ==
Asymmetric cell divisions during the first steps of the embryogenesis of C. elegans

In C. elegans, a series of asymmetric cell divisions in the early embryo are critical in setting up the anterior/posterior, dorsal/ventral, and left/right axes of the body plan. After fertilization, events are already occurring in the zygote to allow for the first asymmetric cell division. This first division produces two distinctly different blastomeres, termed AB and P1. When the sperm cell fertilizes the egg cell, the sperm pronucleus and centrosomes are deposited within the egg, which causes a cytoplasmic flux resulting in the movement of the pronucleus and centrosomes towards one pole. The centrosomes deposited by the sperm are responsible for the establishment of the posterior pole within the zygote. Sperm with mutant or absent centrosomes fail to establish a posterior pole. The establishment of this polarity initiates the polarized distribution of a group of proteins present in the zygote called the PAR proteins (partitioning defective), which are a conserved group of proteins that function in establishing cell polarity during development. These proteins are initially distributed uniformly throughout the zygote and then become polarized with the creation of the posterior pole. This series of events allows the single celled zygote to obtain polarity through an unequal distribution of multiple factors.

The single cell is now set up to undergo an asymmetric cell division, however the orientation in which the division occurs is also an important factor. The mitotic spindle must be oriented correctly to ensure that the proper cell fate determinants are distributed appropriately to the daughter cells. The alignment of the spindle is mediated by the PAR proteins, which regulate the positioning of the centrosomes along the A/P axis as well as the movement of the mitotic spindle along the A/P axis. Following this first asymmetric division, the AB daughter cell divides symmetrically, giving rise to ABa and ABp, while the P1 daughter cell undergoes another asymmetric cell division to produce P2 and EMS. This division is also dependent on the distribution of the PAR proteins.

== In Drosophila neural development ==
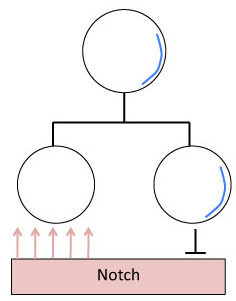
Numb (blue) is asymmetrically distributed within the neuroblast. Following cell division, the GMC contains the Numb protein which suppresses Notch signaling. The other daughter cell is receptive to Notch signaling, causing distinct cellular responses, and ultimately two distinct cell fates between the daughter cells.

In Drosophila melanogaster, asymmetric cell division plays an important role in neural development. Neuroblasts are the progenitor cells which divide asymmetrically to give rise to another neuroblast and a ganglion mother cell (GMC). The neuroblast repeatedly undergoes this asymmetric cell division while the GMC continues on to produce a pair of neurons. Two proteins play an important role in setting up this cell fate asymmetry in the neuroblast, Prospero and Numb. These proteins are both synthesized in the neuroblast and segregate into only the GMC during divisions. Numb is a suppressor of Notch, therefore the asymmetric segregation of Numb to the basal cortex biases the response of the daughter cells to Notch signaling, resulting in two distinct cell fates. Prospero is required for gene regulation in GMCs. It is equally distributed throughout the neuroblast cytoplasm, but becomes localized at the basal cortex when the neuroblast starts to undergo mitosis. Once the GMC buds off from the basal cortex, Prospero becomes translocated into the GMC nucleus to act as a transcription factor.

Other proteins present in the neuroblast mediate the asymmetric localization of Numb and Prospero. Miranda is an anchoring protein that binds to Prospero and keeps it in the basal cortex. Following the generation of the GMC, Miranda releases Prospero and then becomes degraded. The segregation of Numb is mediated by Pon (the partner of Numb protein). Pon binds to Numb and colocalizes with it during neuroblast cell division.

The mitotic spindle must also align parallel to the asymmetrically distributed cell fate determinants to allow them to become segregated into one daughter cell and not the other. The mitotic spindle orientation is mediated by Inscuteable, which is segregated to the apical cortex of the neuroblast. Without the presence of Inscuteable, the positioning of the mitotic spindle and the cell fate determinants in relationship to each other becomes randomized. Inscuteable mutants display a uniform distribution of Miranda and Numb at the cortex, and the resulting daughter cells display identical neuronal fates.

In addition to the two daughter cells having separate fates, they have different cell sizes; the resulting neuroblast is much larger than the GMC. However, unlike with the proper segregation of fate determinants, asymmetric cell division that gives rise to cell size asymmetry is spindle-independent. The mechanism instead relies on the spatial and temporal organization of myosin on the cell cortex and its upstream components. Apical localization of Pins (Partner of Inscuteable) by Inscuteable allows Pins-dependent apical Protein Kinase N (Pkn) localization during metaphase. Pkn inhibits Rho-kinase (Rok), resulting in the timely loss of myosin and Rok from the apical cortex at anaphase onset. The apical myosin flows basally to where the cleavage furrow is positioned. Subsequently, the proteins Tum and Pav at the central spindle recruit myosin to increase myosin concentration, generating a myosin gradient to drive apical myosin flow from the basal cortex. This spatiotemporal control of myosin localization results in the asymmetric loss of cortical tension that normally pushes against hydrostatic pressure. In other words, the loss of apical cortical myosin allows hydrostatic pressure to push against the apical cell membrane, increasing the size of the apical region that is bound to become the larger neuroblast after cell division. Generation of apical and basal myosin flows simultaneously results in symmetric cell division, and delaying of basal myosin flows prevents normal expansion of the basal region of the dividing cell. Although this mechanism is spindle-independent, the spindle is important for setting up the cleavage furrow position, for bringing myosin to the cleavage furrow, and for driving basal myosin clearing.

Actomyosin-based cortical flows direct a reorganization of the plasma membrane and cell cortex of the neuroblast, which is needed to generate the size difference between daughter cells. Early in mitosis, cortical flows collect membrane folds and protrusions around the apical pole forming a polarized membrane reservoir. As myosin clears from the apical cortex and cleavage furrow ingression causes hydrostatic pressure to increase, the stores of membrane within the reservoir are used to expand the apical region which becomes the larger daughter cell after division.

== In spiralian development ==
Spiralia (commonly synonymous with lophotrochozoa) represent a diverse clade of animals whose species comprise the bulk of the bilaterian animals present today. Examples include mollusks, annelid worms, and the entoprocta. Although much is known at the cellular and molecular level about the other bilateralian clades (ecdysozoa and deuterostomia), research into the processes that govern spiralian development is comparatively lacking. However, one unifying feature shared among spiralia is the pattern of cleavage in the early embryo known as spiral cleavage.

Mechanisms of asymmetric division (See Figure, right panel):

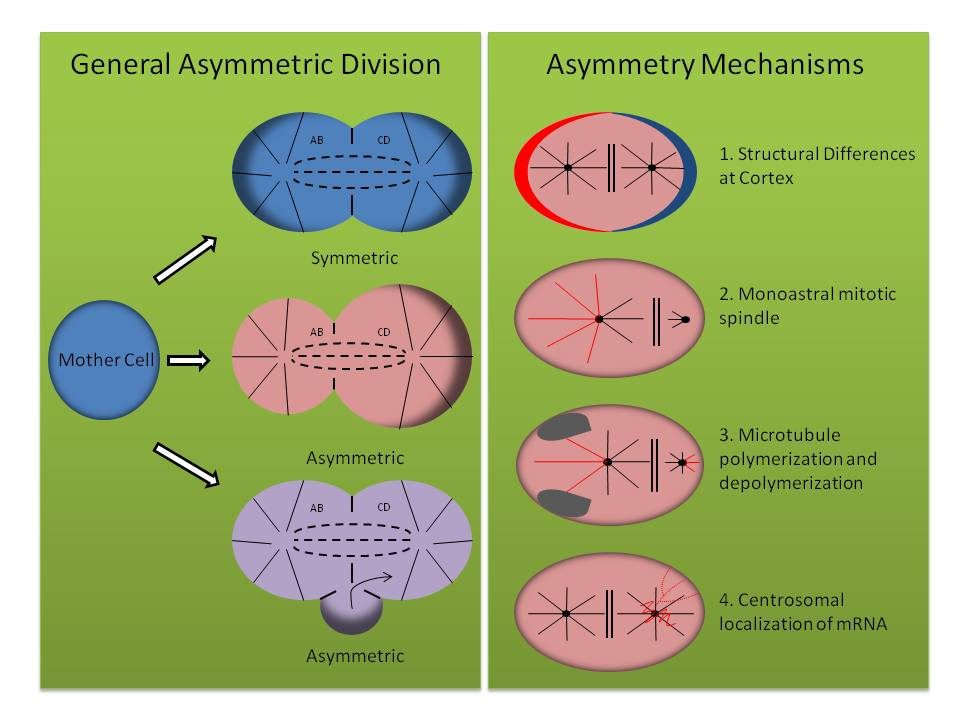
Asymmetric cell division is integral during development. In spiralia, the first cleavage can be either symmetric or asymmetric, as shown in the left panel. Asymmetry can be accomplished through simple unequal segregation of cell fate determinants across a single plane, through sequestration of cell fate determinants in a polar lobe which is absorbed by one of the daughter cells, or a combination of both processes. The right panel summarizes the mechanisms of spiralian asymmetric cleavage discussed here. Red features indicate the molecule(s) implicated in establishing asymmetry.

- Tubifex tubifex: The sludge worm Tubifex tubifex has been shown to demonstrate an interesting asymmetric cell division at the point of first embryonic cleavage. Unlike the classic idea of cortical differences at the zygotic membrane that determine spindle asymmetry in the C. elegans embryo, the first cleavage in tubifex relies on the number of centrosomes. Embryos inherit a single centrosome which localizes in the prospective larger CD cell cytoplasm and emits radial microtubules during anaphase that contribute to both the mitotic spindle as well as cortical asters. However, the microtubule organizing center of the prospective smaller AB cell emits only microtubules that commit to the mitotic spindle and not cortical bound asters. When embryos are compressed or deformed, asymmetric spindles still form, and staining for gamma tubulin reveals that the second microtubule organizing center lacks the molecular signature of a centrosome. Furthermore, when centrosome number is doubled, tubifex embryos cleave symmetrically, suggesting this monoastral mechanism of asymmetric cell division is centrosome dependent.
- Helobdella robusta: The leech Helobdella robusta exhibits a similar asymmetry in the first embryonic division as C. elegans and tubifex, but relies on a modified mechanism. Compression experiments on the robusta embryo do not affect asymmetric division, suggesting the mechanism, like tubifex, uses a cortical independent molecular pathway. In robusta, antibody staining reveals that the mitotic spindle forms symmetrically until metaphase and stems from two biastral centrosomes. At the onset of metaphase, asymmetry becomes apparent as the centrosome of the prospective larger CD cell lengthens cortical asters while the asters of the prospective smaller AB cell become downregulated. Experiments using nocodazole and taxol support this observation. Taxol, which stabilized microtubules, forced a significant number of embryos to cleave symmetrically when used at a moderate concentration. Moreover, embryos treated with nocodazole, which sequesters tubulin dimers and promotes microtubule depolymerization, similarly forced symmetric division in a significant number of embryos. Treatment with either drug at these concentrations fails to disrupt normal centrosome dynamics, suggesting that a balance of microtubule polymerization and depolymerization represents another mechanism for establishing asymmetric cell division in spilarian development.
- Ilyanasa obsoleta: A third, less traditional mechanism contributing to asymmetric cell division in spiralian development has been discovered in the mollusk Ilyanasa obsoleta. In situ hybridization and immunofluorescence experiments show that mRNA transcripts co-localize with centrosomes during early cleavage. Consequently, these transcripts are inherited in a stereotypical fashion to distinct cells. All mRNA transcripts followed have been implicated in body axis patterning, and in situ hybridization for transcripts associated with other functions fail to exhibit such a localization. Moreover, disruption of microtubule polymerization with nocodazole, and of actin polymerization with cytochalisin B, shows the cytoskeleton is also important in this asymmetry. It appears that microtubules are not required to recruit the mRNA to the centrosome, and that actin is required to attach the centrosome to the cortex. Finally, introducing multiple centrosomes into one cell by inhibiting cytokinesis shows that mRNA dependably localizes on the correct centrosome, suggesting intrinsic differences between each centrosomal composition. These results reflect experiments performed after the first two divisions, yet still demonstrate a different molecular means of establishing asymmetry in a dividing cell.

== In stem cells and progenitors ==
Animals are made up of a vast number of distinct cell types. During development, the zygote undergoes many cell divisions that give rise to various cell types, including embryonic stem cells. Asymmetric divisions of these embryonic cells gives rise to one cell of the same potency (self-renewal), and another that maybe of the same potency or stimulated to further differentiate into specialized cell types such as neurons. This stimulated differentiation arises from many factors which can be divided into two broad categories: intrinsic and extrinsic. Intrinsic factors generally involve differing amounts of cell-fate determinants being distributed into each daughter cell. Extrinsic factors involve interactions with neighboring cells and the micro and macro environment of the precursor cell.

In addition to the aforementioned Drosophila neuronal example, it was proposed that the macrosensory organs of the Drosophila, specifically the glial cells, also arise from a similar set of asymmetric division from a single progenitor cell via regulation of the Notch signaling pathway and transcription factors. An example of how extrinsic factors bring about this phenomenon is the physical displacement of one of the daughter cells out of the original stem cell niche, exposing it to signalling molecules such as chondroitin sulfate. In this manner, the daughter cell is forced to interact with the heavily sulfated molecules, which stimulate it to differentiate while the other daughter cell remains in the original niche in a quiescent state.

== Role in disease ==
In normal stem and progenitor cells, asymmetric cell division balances proliferation and self-renewal with cell-cycle exit and differentiation. Disruption of asymmetric cell division leads to aberrant self-renewal and impairs differentiation, and could therefore constitute an early step in the tumorogenic transformation of stem and progenitor cells. In normal non-tumor stem cells, a number of genes have been described which are responsible for pluripotency, such as Bmi-1, Wnt and Notch. These genes have been discovered also in the case of cancer stem cells, and shows that their aberrant expression is essential for the formation of tumor cell mass. For example, it has been shown that gastrointestinal cancers contain rare subpopulation of cancer stem cells which are capable to divide asymmetrically. The asymmetric division in these cells is regulated by cancer niche (microenvironment) and Wnt pathway. Blocking the Wnt pathway with IWP2 (WNT antagonist) or siRNA-TCF4 resulted in high suppression of asymmetric cell division.

Another mutation in asymmetric cell divisions which are involved in tumor growth are loss-of-function mutations. The first suggestion that loss of asymmetric cell division might be involved in tumorigenesis came from studies of Drosophila. Studies of loss-of-function mutations in key regulators of asymmetric cell division including lgl, aurA, polo, numb and brat, revealed hyperproliferative phenotypes in situ. In these mutants cells divide more symmetrically and generate mis-specified progeny that fail to exit the cell cycle and differentiate, but rather proliferate continuously and form a tumor cell mass.
