= DPYSL2 =

Protein-coding gene in the species Homo sapiens

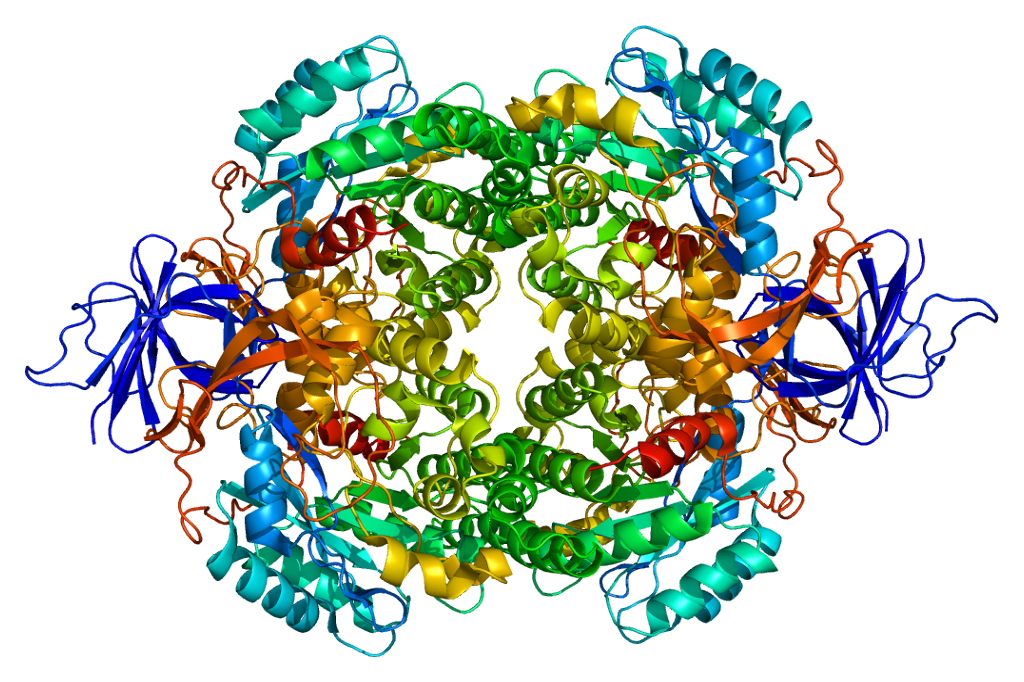

Identifiers
- Aliases: DPYSL2, CRMP-2, CRMP2, DHPRP2, DRP-2, DRP2, N2A3, ULIP-2, ULIP2, dihydropyrimidinase like 2
- External IDs: OMIM: 602463; MGI: 1349763; GeneCards: DPYSL2
Available structures
PDB	Ortholog search: PDBe RCSB
PDB	List of PDB id codes 2GSE, 2VM8

Gene location (Human)
Chr.	Chromosome 8 (human)
Band	8p21.2	Start	26,514,031 bp
Band	8p21.2	End	26,658,178 bp

Gene location (Mouse)
Chr.	Chromosome 14 (mouse)
Band	14 D1|14 34.6 cM	Start	67,040,313 bp
Band	14 D1|14 34.6 cM	End	67,106,137 bp
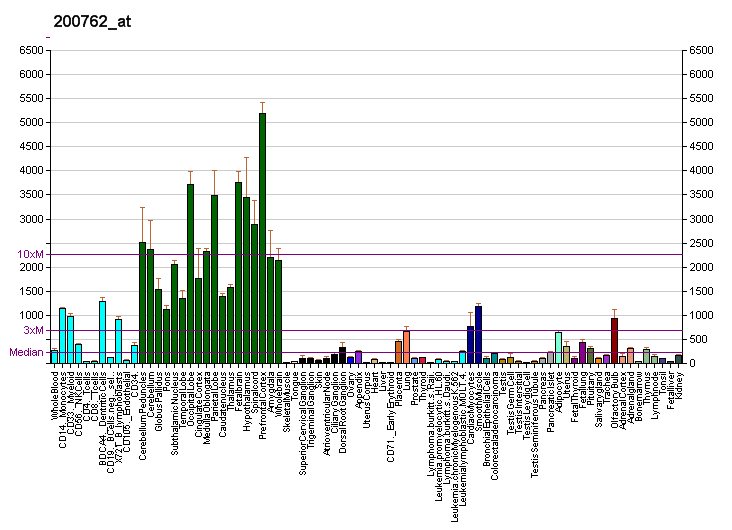
RNA expression pattern
Bgee	Human / Mouse (ortholog); Top expressed in: inferior ganglion of vagus nerve; pars reticulata; subthalamic nucleus; pars compacta; superior vestibular nucleus; external globus pallidus; pons; cerebellar vermis; lateral nuclear group of thalamus; paraflocculus of cerebellum / Top expressed in: paraventricular nucleus of hypothalamus; globus pallidus; anterior amygdaloid area; habenula; medial geniculate nucleus; dorsomedial hypothalamic nucleus; ventral tegmental area; medial dorsal nucleus; anterior horn of spinal cord; subiculum; More reference expression data
BioGPS	More reference expression data
Gene ontology
Molecular function	microtubule binding; dihydropyrimidinase activity; protein binding; hydrolase activity, acting on carbon-nitrogen (but not peptide) bonds; hydrolase activity; identical protein binding
Cellular component	cytoplasm; cytosol; membrane; extracellular exosome; microtubule; cytoskeleton; plasma membrane
Biological process	regulation of neuron differentiation; cell differentiation; endocytosis; regulation of axon extension; nervous system development; multicellular organism development; brain development; cytoskeleton organization; nucleobase-containing compound metabolic process; signal transduction; axon guidance; pyrimidine nucleobase catabolic process
Sources:Amigo / QuickGO
Orthologs
Databases	NCBI: entry; OMA: entry
Species	Human	Mouse
Entrez	1808	12934
Ensembl	ENSG00000092964	ENSMUSG00000022048
UniProt	Q16555	O08553
RefSeq (mRNA)	NM_001386; NM_001197293; NM_001244604	NM_009955; NM_001378767
RefSeq (protein)	NP_001184222; NP_001231533; NP_001377	NP_034085; NP_001365696
Location (UCSC)	Chr 8: 26.51 – 26.66 Mb	Chr 14: 67.04 – 67.11 Mb
PubMed search
- Wikidata
View/Edit Human	View/Edit Mouse

Dihydropyrimidinase-related protein 2 is an enzyme that in humans is encoded by the DPYSL2 gene.

== Interactions ==
DPYSL2 has been shown to interact with CRMP1, Adaptor-related protein complex 2, alpha 1 and NUMB.
