= Phosphorothioate nucleic acid =

Chemical compound

A phosphorothioate nucleic acid is a nucleic acid analogue where the backbone phosphate groups each have one oxygen atom replaced with a sulfur atom, making them thiophosphate groups instead.

== Structure and properties ==
S_{p} and R_{p}-diastereomeric internucleosidic phosphorothioate linkages.

Oligonucleotide phosphorothioates (OPS) are modified oligonucleotides where one of the oxygen atoms in the phosphate moiety is replaced by sulfur. Only the phosphorothioates having sulfur at a non-bridging position as shown in figure are widely used and are available commercially.

Nucleoside organothiophosphate (PS) analogs of nucleotides give oligonucleotides some beneficial properties. Key beneficial properties that PS backbones give nucleotides are diastereomer identification of each nucleotide and the ability to easily follow reactions involving the phosphorothioate nucleotides, which is useful in oligonucleotide synthesis. PS backbone modifications to oligonucleotides protects them against unwanted degradation by enzymes. Modifying the nucleotide backbone is widely used because it can be achieved with relative ease and accuracy on most nucleotides. Fluorescent modifications on 5' and 3' end of oligonucleotides was reported to evaluate the oligonucleotides structures, dynamics and interactions with respect to environment.

The replacement of the non-bridging oxygen with sulfur creates a new center of chirality at phosphorus. In a simple case of a dinucleotide, this results in the formation of a diastereomeric pair of S_{p}- and R_{p}-dinucleoside monophosphorothioates whose structures are shown in Figure. In an n-mer oligonucleotide where all (n – 1) internucleosidic linkages are phosphorothioate linkages, the number of diastereomers m is calculated as m = 2^{(n – 1)}.

Mergny and Lacroix determined that the addition of a bulky methyl group had a destabilizing effect on the i-motif formation when they compared phosphorothioate, the natural phosphodiester, methylphosphonate, and peptide linkages and determined that only phosphodiester and phosphorothioate oligodeoxynucleotides were capable of forming stable i-motifs.

== Applications ==
Being non-natural analogs of nucleic acids, OPS are substantially more stable towards hydrolysis by nucleases, the class of enzymes that destroy nucleic acids by breaking the bridging P-O bond of the phosphodiester moiety. This property determines the use of OPS as antisense oligonucleotides in in vitro and in vivo applications where the extensive exposure to nucleases is inevitable. Similarly, to improve the stability of siRNA, at least one phosphorothioate linkage is often introduced at the 3'-terminus of both sense and antisense strands.

In chirally pure OPS, all-Sp diastereomers are more stable to enzymatic degradation than their all-Rp analogs. However, the preparation of chirally pure OPS remains a synthetic challenge. In laboratory practice, mixtures of diastereomers of OPS are commonly used.

=== Antisense pharmaceuticals ===
In the United States, the Food and Drug Administration (FDA) has approved the phosphorothioate antisense oligonucleotides fomivirsen (Vitravene) and mipomersen (Kynamro) for human therapeutic use in antisense therapy. To prevent degradation of the therapeutic oliogoneucleotides, chemical modification is usually required. The most common chemical modification on the oligonucleotides is adding a phosphorothioate linkage to the backbones. However, the phosphrothioate modification can be proinflammatory. Adverse effects including fever, chills or nausea have been observed after local injection of phosphrothioate modified oligonucleotides.

Gapmers often utilize nucleotides modified with phosphorothioate (PS) groups. Miravirsen is an antisense phosphorothioate oligonucleotides that is additionally a locked nucleic acid gapmer. Other antisense oligonucleotides using phosphorothioates include afovirsen, aganirsen, alicaforsen, bepirovirsen, custirsen, drisapersen, eplontersen, evazarsen, gataparsen, inotersen, IONIS-GCCR_{Rx}, nusinersen, oblimersen, olezarsen, pelacarsen, sefaxersen, tofersen, and volanesorsen.

First-generation anti-miRNA oligonucleotides utilized 2’-O-Methyl RNA nucleotides with phosphorothioate internucleotide linkages positioned at both ends to prevent exonuclease attack. This was also shown to have an effect on target affinity. Using the P-S mutation was shown to decrease the Tm of the oligonucleotide, which leads to a lower target affinity.

=== Other pharmaceuticals ===
In 2017, a two-dose HBV vaccine for adults, the hepatitis B vaccine Heplisav-B gained U.S. Food and Drug Administration (FDA) approval. It uses recombinant HB surface antigen, similar to previous vaccines, but includes a novel CpG 1018 adjuvant, a 22-mer phosphorothioate-linked oligodeoxynucleotide. It was non-inferior concerning immunogenicity.

Phosphorothioate groups are also used in synthetic CpG oligodeoxynucleotides.

=== Laboratory applications ===
Other applications include phosphorothioate-based ligase-independent cloning, sequence saturation mutagenesis, no-SCAR genome editing, nucleotide analog interference mapping, and incremental truncation for the creation of hybrid enzymes, and antibody-oligonucleotide conjugates.

== Synthesis ==
Synthesis of OPS is very similar to that of natural oligonucleotides. The difference is that the oxidation step is replaced by sulfur transfer reaction (sulfurization) and that the capping step is performed after the sulfurization. Of many reported reagents capable of the efficient sulfur transfer, only three are commercially available:

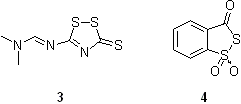
Commercial sulfur transfer agents for oligonucleotide synthesis.

- 3-(Dimethylaminomethylidene)amino-3H-1,2,4-dithiazole-3-thione, DDTT (3) provides rapid kinetics of sulfurization and high stability in solution. The reagent is available from several sources.
- 3H-1,2-benzodithiol-3-one 1,1-dioxide (4) also known as Beaucage reagent displays a better solubility in acetonitrile and short reaction times. However, the reagent is of limited stability in solution and is less efficient in sulfurizing RNA linkages.
- N,N,N'N'-Tetraethylthiuram disulfide (TETD) is soluble in acetonitrile and is commercially available. However, the sulfurization reaction of an internucleosidic DNA linkage with TETD requires 15 min, which is more than 10 times as slow as that with compounds 3 and 4.
