= Antibody–oligonucleotide conjugate =

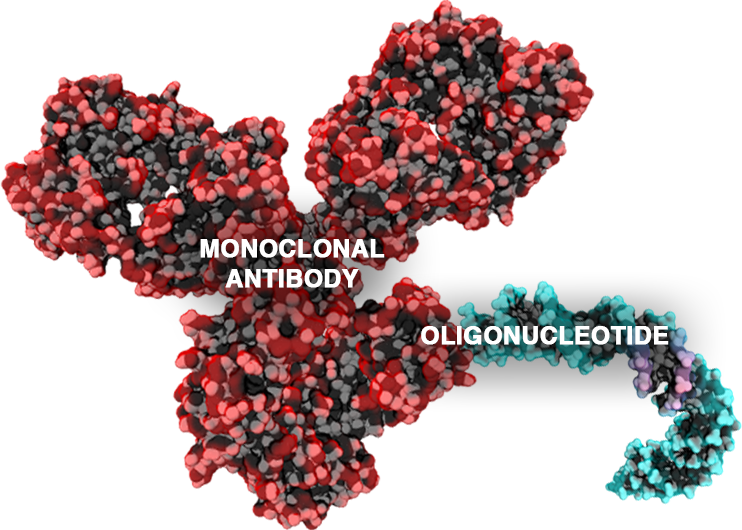
Schematic structure of an antibody-oligonucleotide conjugate (AOC)

Antibody–oligonucleotide conjugates or AOCs belong to a class of chimeric molecules combining in their structure two important families of biomolecules: monoclonal antibodies and oligonucleotides.

Combination of exceptional targeting capabilities of monoclonal antibodies with numerous functional modalities of oligonucleotides has been fruitful for a variety of applications with AOC including imaging, detection and targeted therapeutics.

Cell uptake/internalisation still represents the biggest hurdle towards successful ON therapeutics. A straightforward uptake, like for most small-molecule drugs, is hindered by the polyanionic backbone and the molecular size of ONs. Being adapted from the broad and successful class of Antibody-Drug conjugates, antibodies and antibody analogues are more and more used in research in order to overcome hurdles related to delivery and internalisation of ON therapeutics. By exploiting bioconjugation methodology several conjugates have been obtained.

== Development of therapeutic AOCs ==
The first AOC was reported in 1995 where the lysines of a transferrin-antibody were connected using a SMCC bifunctional linker (NHS ester and maleimide moiety) to radiolabelled and cys-bearing ASOs targeting HIV mRNA. Marcin and his colleagues developed a different construct using the same chemistry, but they utilized siRNA instead of an ASO in 2011. In 2013, MYERS and coworkers then unspecifically labelled an anti-CD19 antibody with N-succinimidyl 3-(2-pyridyl-dithio) propionate to form disulphide bonds with cys-modified ASO targeting the mRNA of oncoprotein E2A–PBX1. Ultimately, they could prove in-vivo antitumour effects which in contrast were not obtained with the single entities. In the same timeframe, several antibodies were exploited for ON delivery in combination with nanoparticles and in non-covalent strategies.

Only recently the first examples for a site-selective conjugation between an ON therapeutic and a mAb was published: in 2015 Genentech exploited the SMCC linker to conjugate siRNA to several engineered mAb based on their proprietary Thiomab technology, which allows site-specific introduction of a cysteine into the antibody sequence[32]. They could prove the functionality of both entities in the construct and by screening different antibodies, they validated their importance for an effective antisense effect. The main obstacle encountered was a limited endosomal escape but ultimately a functional construct which shows antisense effect in-vivo was reported. After development of the SMCC based conjugates, there were two constructs reported in literature based on strain-promoted alkyne-azide cycloadditions: an MXD3 mRNA targeting gapmer (cEt and PS modified) linked to an anti-CD22 antibody targeting preB cells leads to in-vitro apoptosis of targeted cells and in-vivo increased length of mouse survival in xenograft models. Notably, the dose required for the same therapeutic effect was 20 times lower for the developed conjugate (vs. naked mAb). Another reported conjugate, exploiting the same unselective conjugation chemistry, employs an CD44 respectively EphA2 targeting antibody which covalently carries a therapeutically irrelevant "sense-carrier" oligonucleotide. This oligonucleotide base pairs with the actual antisense oligonucleotide (gapmer bearing phosphorothioate linkages and 2’-deoxy-2’-fluoro-beta-D-arabinonucleic acid modifications and a terminal fluorophor) aiming for an increased RNaseH activity.

== Use for multiplex imaging ==
Most biological optical techniques can only separate a small number of colors, typically three or four. So what if you want to distinguish a larger number of labels? One solution is to use a wide variety of antibodies, each tagged with a unique oligonucleotide. Then three or so dyes can be introduced, each congugated with a complementary oligonucleotide. The dyes bind to the corresponding antibodies, the sample is imaged, then the dyes washed out. Then new dyes, with different oligonucleatides, can be introduced to label an addition set of antibodies, and the sample re-imaged. This process can be repeated, and tens to hundreds of additional labels are likely feasible. An example of where this technique is helpful is in neurotransmitter identification and identification of other structures that are difficult to interpret in images with few colors.

== Antibody analogue–oligonucleotide conjugate ==
Despite their tremendous potential, ADCs and AOCs suffer from the physical size of the antibody (mAb) entity (150 kDa) which limits solid tumour penetration (at least at low concentrations). Moreover, the site-selective modification of the antibody is hardly achievable: due to the difficult production of mAbs the selective introduction of an unnatural amino acid into the protein is not easily possible.

Thats why there is intensive research to exploit antibody analogues and antibody fragments which retain a high target specificity but combined with a smaller size and a greater possibility of modification. Nanobodies for example are natural single-domain antibodies found in camelids with an average mass of 15kDa. They bear an increased stability, solubility and tissue penetration compared to mAbs.

One conjugate, consisting out of an EGFR Nanobody and a siRNA being combined through maleimide bioconjugation, proves the possibility of successful delivery of ONs by nanobodies.

Another example consists out of an anti-CD71 Fab fragment which was conjugated to a maleimide bearing siRNA (itself having 2’OMe/2’F modifications and phosphorothioate linkages). Several (cleavable and uncleavable) linkers between the maleimide moiety and the siRNA were screened revealing only a small influence on silencing efficacy (uncleavable linkers leading to the best results). To play out the small size of the Fab fragment, subcutaneous administration was investigated in mouse models leading to equivalent silencing results compared to intravenous administration. By comparison with other mAb–siRNA conjugates the authors even speculate that endosomal escape is largely facilitated by the smaller size of the Fab (vs. mAb).

Moreover, Nanobody–ON conjugates are intensively used for imaging purposes exploiting the small nanobody size to reduce imaging displacement.

== See also ==
- Antibody-drug conjugate
- Conjugated protein
- Immune stimulating antibody conjugate
- Bioconjugation
