= Evazarsen =

Clinical data
- Other names: IONIS-AGT-LRx

Legal status
- Legal status: Investigational

Identifiers
- IUPAC name: all-P-ambo-5'-O-(((6-(5-((tris(3-(6-(2-acetamido-2-deoxy-β-D-galactopyranosyloxy)hexylamino)-3-oxopropoxymethyl))methyl)amino-5-oxopentanamido)hexyl))phospho)-2'-O-(2-methoxyethyl)-5-methyl-P-thiocytidylyl-(3'→5')-2'-O-(2-methoxyethyl)-P-thioadenylyl-(3'→5')-2'-O-(2-methoxyethyl)-5-methyl-P-thiocytidylyl-(3'→5')-2'-O-(2-methoxyethyl)-P-thioadenylyl-(3'→5')-2'-O-(2-methoxyethyl)-P-thioadenylyl-(3'→5')-2'-deoxy-P-thioadenylyl-(3'→5')-2'-deoxy-5-methyl-P-thiocytidylyl-(3'→5')-2'-deoxy-P-thioadenylyl-(3'→5')-2'-deoxy-P-thioadenylyl-(3'→5')-2'-deoxy-P-thioguanylyl-(3'→5')-2'-deoxy-5-methyl-P-thiocytidylyl-(3'→5')-P-thiothymidylyl-(3'→5')-2'-deoxy-P-thioguanylyl-(3'→5')-2'-deoxy-P-thioguanylyl-(3'→5')-P-thiothymidylyl- (3'→5')-2'-O-(2-methoxyethyl)-5-methyl-P-thiocytidylyl-(3'→5')-2'-O-(2-methoxyethyl)-P-thioguanylyl-(3'→5')-2'-O-(2-methoxyethyl)-P-thioguanylyl-(3'→5')-2'-O-(2-methoxyethyl)-5-methyl-P-thiouridylyl-(3'→5')-2'-O-(2-methoxyethyl)-5-methyluridine
- CAS Number: 2589926-24-7
- UNII: W3077QR2KG

Chemical and physical data
- Formula: C_{296}H_{434}N_{86}O_{146}P_{20}S_{19}
- Molar mass: 8761.80 g·mol^{−1}
- SMILES: COCCO[C@@H]1[C@H](O)[C@@H](COP(O)(=S)O[C@H]2[C@@H](OCCOC)[C@H](n3cc(C)c(=O)[nH]c3=O)O[C@@H]2COP(O)(=S)O[C@H]2[C@@H](OCCOC)[C@H](n3cnc4c(=O)[nH]c(N)nc43)O[C@@H]2COP(O)(=S)O[C@H]2[C@@H](OCCOC)[C@H](n3cnc4c(=O)[nH]c(N)nc43)O[C@@H]2COP(O)(=S)O[C@H]2[C@@H](OCCOC)[C@H](n3cc(C)c(N)nc3=O)O[C@@H]2COP(O)(=S)O[C@H]2C[C@H](n3cc(C)c(=O)[nH]c3=O)O[C@@H]2COP(O)(=S)O[C@H]2C[C@H](n3cnc4c(=O)[nH]c(N)nc43)O[C@@H]2COP(O)(=S)O[C@H]2C[C@H](n3cnc4c(=O)[nH]c(N)nc43)O[C@@H]2COP(O)(=S)O[C@H]2C[C@H](n3cc(C)c(=O)[nH]c3=O)O[C@@H]2COP(O)(=S)O[C@H]2C[C@H](n3cc(C)c(N)nc3=O)O[C@@H]2COP(O)(=S)O[C@H]2C[C@H](n3cnc4c(=O)[nH]c(N)nc43)O[C@@H]2COP(O)(=S)O[C@H]2C[C@H](n3cnc4c(N)ncnc43)O[C@@H]2COP(O)(=S)O[C@H]2C[C@H](n3cnc4c(N)ncnc43)O[C@@H]2COP(O)(=S)O[C@H]2C[C@H](n3cc(C)c(N)nc3=O)O[C@@H]2COP(O)(=S)O[C@H]2C[C@H](n3cnc4c(N)ncnc43)O[C@@H]2COP(O)(=S)O[C@H]2[C@@H](OCCOC)[C@H](n3cnc4c(N)ncnc43)O[C@@H]2COP(O)(=S)O[C@H]2[C@@H](OCCOC)[C@H](n3cnc4c(N)ncnc43)O[C@@H]2COP(O)(=S)O[C@H]2[C@@H](OCCOC)[C@H](n3cc(C)c(N)nc3=O)O[C@@H]2COP(O)(=S)O[C@H]2[C@@H](OCCOC)[C@H](n3cnc4c(N)ncnc43)O[C@@H]2COP(O)(=S)O[C@H]2[C@@H](OCCOC)[C@H](n3cc(C)c(N)nc3=O)O[C@@H]2COP(=O)(O)OCCCCCCNC(=O)CCCC(=O)NC(COCCC(=O)NCCCCCCO[C@@H]2O[C@H](CO)[C@H](O)[C@H](O)[C@H]2NC(C)=O)(COCCC(=O)NCCCCCCO[C@@H]2O[C@H](CO)[C@H](O)[C@H](O)[C@H]2NC(C)=O)COCCC(=O)NCCCCCCO[C@@H]2O[C@H](CO)[C@H](O)[C@H](O)[C@H]2NC(C)=O)O[C@H]1n1cc(C)c(=O)[nH]c1=O
- InChI: InChI=1S/C296H434N86O146P20S19/c1-138-86-363(287(410)343-238(138)297)188-76-150(510-530(421,549)468-100-165-152(78-190(489-165)365-91-143(6)260(401)358-292(365)415)512-532(423,551)474-104-169-159(85-197(494-169)377-132-337-209-257(377)350-284(310)355-266(209)407)519-538(429,557)476-106-171-158(84-196(496-171)376-131-336-208-256(376)349-283(309)354-265(208)406)518-535(426,554)471-101-166-153(79-191(490-166)366-92-144(7)261(402)359-293(366)416)513-539(430,558)479-110-175-220(230(455-68-58-442-15)271(499-175)368-89-141(4)241(300)346-290(368)413)522-544(435,563)485-116-181-227(237(462-75-65-449-22)278(505-181)382-137-339-211-259(382)352-286(312)357-268(211)409)528-548(439,567)486-117-182-226(236(461-74-64-448-21)277(506-182)381-136-338-210-258(381)351-285(311)356-267(210)408)527-546(437,565)481-112-177-222(232(457-70-60-444-17)273(501-177)371-94-146(9)263(404)361-295(371)418)521-541(432,560)478-108-173-215(397)228(453-66-56-440-13)269(497-173)370-93-145(8)262(403)360-294(370)417)164(488-188)99-470-534(425,553)517-157-83-195(375-130-335-207-255(375)348-282(308)353-264(207)405)495-170(157)105-475-537(428,556)515-155-81-193(373-128-330-202-244(303)318-122-324-250(202)373)492-168(155)103-473-536(427,555)514-154-80-192(372-127-329-201-243(302)317-121-323-249(201)372)491-167(154)102-472-531(422,550)511-151-77-189(364-87-139(2)239(298)344-288(364)411)487-163(151)98-469-533(424,552)516-156-82-194(374-129-331-203-245(304)319-123-325-251(203)374)493-172(156)107-477-540(431,559)524-223-178(502-274(233(223)458-71-61-445-18)378-133-332-204-246(305)320-124-326-252(204)378)113-484-547(438,566)526-225-180(504-276(235(225)460-73-63-447-20)380-135-334-206-248(307)322-126-328-254(206)380)115-483-543(434,562)523-221-176(500-272(231(221)456-69-59-443-16)369-90-142(5)242(301)347-291(369)414)111-480-545(436,564)525-224-179(503-275(234(224)459-72-62-446-19)379-134-333-205-247(306)321-125-327-253(205)379)114-482-542(433,561)520-219-174(498-270(229(219)454-67-57-441-14)367-88-140(3)240(299)345-289(367)412)109-467-529(419,420)466-52-38-30-26-34-45-313-183(389)40-39-41-187(393)362-296(118-450-53-42-184(390)314-46-31-23-27-35-49-463-279-198(340-147(10)386)216(398)212(394)160(95-383)507-279,119-451-54-43-185(391)315-47-32-24-28-36-50-464-280-199(341-148(11)387)217(399)213(395)161(96-384)508-280)120-452-55-44-186(392)316-48-33-25-29-37-51-465-281-200(342-149(12)388)218(400)214(396)162(97-385)509-281/h86-94,121-137,150-182,188-200,212-237,269-281,383-385,394-400H,23-85,95-120H2,1-22H3,(H,313,389)(H,314,390)(H,315,391)(H,316,392)(H,340,386)(H,341,387)(H,342,388)(H,362,393)(H,419,420)(H,421,549)(H,422,550)(H,423,551)(H,424,552)(H,425,553)(H,426,554)(H,427,555)(H,428,556)(H,429,557)(H,430,558)(H,431,559)(H,432,560)(H,433,561)(H,434,562)(H,435,563)(H,436,564)(H,437,565)(H,438,566)(H,439,567)(H2,297,343,410)(H2,298,344,411)(H2,299,345,412)(H2,300,346,413)(H2,301,347,414)(H2,302,317,323)(H2,303,318,324)(H2,304,319,325)(H2,305,320,326)(H2,306,321,327)(H2,307,322,328)(H,358,401,415)(H,359,402,416)(H,360,403,417)(H,361,404,418)(H3,308,348,353,405)(H3,309,349,354,406)(H3,310,350,355,407)(H3,311,351,356,408)(H3,312,352,357,409)/t150-,151-,152-,153-,154-,155-,156-,157-,158-,159-,160+,161+,162+,163+,164+,165+,166+,167+,168+,169+,170+,171+,172+,173+,174+,175+,176+,177+,178+,179+,180+,181+,182+,188+,189+,190+,191+,192+,193+,194+,195+,196+,197+,198+,199+,200+,212-,213-,214-,215+,216+,217+,218+,219+,220+,221+,222+,223+,224+,225+,226+,227+,228+,229+,230+,231+,232+,233+,234+,235+,236+,237+,269+,270+,271+,272+,273+,274+,275+,276+,277+,278+,279+,280+,281+,530?,531?,532?,533?,534?,535?,536?,537?,538?,539?,540?,541?,542?,543?,544?,545?,546?,547?,548?/m0/s1; Key:YXPFHXCUIFJZDH-JCSPNYBJSA-N

Evazarsen (codenamed IONIS-AGT-LRx), usually supplied as its sodium salt, is an antisense gapmer oligonucleotide designed to inhibit angiotensinogen as an alternative to other mechanisms to target the renin–angiotensin–aldosterone system.
