= Afovirsen =

Names
- IUPAC name all-P-ambo-P-thiothymidylyl-(3'→5')-P-thiothymidylyl-(3'→5')-2'-deoxy-P-thioguanylyl-(3'→5')-2'-deoxy-P-thiocytidylyl-(3'→5')-P-thiothymidylyl-(3'→5')-P-thiothymidylyl-(3'→5')-2'-deoxy-P-thiocytidylyl-(3'→5')-2'-deoxy-P-thiocytidylyl-(3'→5')-2'-deoxy-P-thioadenylyl-(3'→5')-P-thiothymidylyl-(3'→5')-2'-deoxy-P-thiocytidylyl-(3'→5')-P-thiothymidylyl-(3'→5')-P-thiothymidylyl-(3'→5')-2'-deoxy-P-thiocytidylyl-(3'→5')-2'-deoxy-P-thiocytidylyl-(3'→5')-P-thiothymidylyl-(3'→5')-2'-deoxy-P-thiocytidylyl-(3'→5')-2'-deoxy-P-thioguanylyl-(3'→5')-P-thiothymidylyl-(3'→5')-2'-deoxycytidine
- Other names ISIS 8741

Identifiers
CAS Number	151356-08-0
3D model (JSmol)	Interactive image
ChemSpider	44255205
PubChem CID	71587499
UNII	378RL020QM
- InChI: InChI=1S/C192H250N57O107P19S19/c1-79-46-238(184(271)221-163(79)252)144-27-89(108(55-250)318-144)338-358(281,377)300-64-117-98(36-146(327-117)240-48-81(3)165(254)223-186(240)273)353-372(295,391)317-74-127-106(44-154(337-127)248-77-207-157-161(248)217-174(202)219-172(157)261)355-373(296,392)307-63-116-94(32-141(326-116)235-23-15-133(198)214-181(235)268)343-363(286,382)310-68-121-104(42-152(331-121)246-54-87(9)171(260)229-192(246)279)352-371(294,390)312-70-123-101(39-149(333-123)243-51-84(6)168(257)226-189(243)276)349-368(291,387)304-60-113-91(29-138(323-113)232-20-12-130(195)211-178(232)265)340-360(283,379)302-58-111-95(33-142(321-111)236-24-16-134(199)215-182(236)269)344-364(287,383)315-72-125-105(43-153(335-125)247-76-206-156-159(201)204-75-205-160(156)247)354-374(297,393)313-71-124-102(40-150(334-124)244-52-85(7)169(258)227-190(244)277)350-369(292,388)305-61-114-93(31-140(324-114)234-22-14-132(197)213-180(234)267)342-362(285,381)309-67-120-103(41-151(330-120)245-53-86(8)170(259)228-191(245)278)351-370(293,389)311-69-122-100(38-148(332-122)242-50-83(5)167(256)225-188(242)275)348-367(290,386)303-59-112-90(28-137(322-112)231-19-11-129(194)210-177(231)264)339-359(282,378)301-57-110-92(30-139(320-110)233-21-13-131(196)212-179(233)266)341-361(284,380)308-66-119-99(37-147(329-119)241-49-82(4)166(255)224-187(241)274)347-366(289,385)306-62-115-96(34-143(325-115)237-25-17-135(200)216-183(237)270)345-365(288,384)316-73-126-107(45-155(336-126)249-78-208-158-162(249)218-175(203)220-173(158)262)356-375(298,394)314-65-118-97(35-145(328-118)239-47-80(2)164(253)222-185(239)272)346-357(280,376)299-56-109-88(251)26-136(319-109)230-18-10-128(193)209-176(230)263/h10-25,46-54,75-78,88-127,136-155,250-251H,26-45,55-74H2,1-9H3,(H,280,376)(H,281,377)(H,282,378)(H,283,379)(H,284,380)(H,285,381)(H,286,382)(H,287,383)(H,288,384)(H,289,385)(H,290,386)(H,291,387)(H,292,388)(H,293,389)(H,294,390)(H,295,391)(H,296,392)(H,297,393)(H,298,394)(H2,193,209,263)(H2,194,210,264)(H2,195,211,265)(H2,196,212,266)(H2,197,213,267)(H2,198,214,268)(H2,199,215,269)(H2,200,216,270)(H2,201,204,205)(H,221,252,271)(H,222,253,272)(H,223,254,273)(H,224,255,274)(H,225,256,275)(H,226,257,276)(H,227,258,277)(H,228,259,278)(H,229,260,279)(H3,202,217,219,261)(H3,203,218,220,262)/t88-,89-,90-,91-,92-,93-,94-,95-,96-,97-,98-,99-,100-,101-,102-,103-,104-,105-,106-,107-,108+,109+,110+,111+,112+,113+,114+,115+,116+,117+,118+,119+,120+,121+,122+,123+,124+,125+,126+,127+,136+,137+,138+,139+,140+,141+,142+,143+,144+,145+,146+,147+,148+,149+,150+,151+,152+,153+,154+,155+,357?,358?,359?,360?,361?,362?,363?,364?,365?,366?,367?,368?,369?,370?,371?,372?,373?,374?,375?/m0/s1 Key: XOHQPRNFRWNWQW-NYUPDZBESA-N; InChI=1/C192H250N57O107P19S19/c1-79-46-238(184(271)221-163(79)252)144-27-89(108(55-250)318-144)338-358(281,377)300-64-117-98(36-146(327-117)240-48-81(3)165(254)223-186(240)273)353-372(295,391)317-74-127-106(44-154(337-127)248-77-207-157-161(248)217-174(202)219-172(157)261)355-373(296,392)307-63-116-94(32-141(326-116)235-23-15-133(198)214-181(235)268)343-363(286,382)310-68-121-104(42-152(331-121)246-54-87(9)171(260)229-192(246)279)352-371(294,390)312-70-123-101(39-149(333-123)243-51-84(6)168(257)226-189(243)276)349-368(291,387)304-60-113-91(29-138(323-113)232-20-12-130(195)211-178(232)265)340-360(283,379)302-58-111-95(33-142(321-111)236-24-16-134(199)215-182(236)269)344-364(287,383)315-72-125-105(43-153(335-125)247-76-206-156-159(201)204-75-205-160(156)247)354-374(297,393)313-71-124-102(40-150(334-124)244-52-85(7)169(258)227-190(244)277)350-369(292,388)305-61-114-93(31-140(324-114)234-22-14-132(197)213-180(234)267)342-362(285,381)309-67-120-103(41-151(330-120)245-53-86(8)170(259)228-191(245)278)351-370(293,389)311-69-122-100(38-148(332-122)242-50-83(5)167(256)225-188(242)275)348-367(290,386)303-59-112-90(28-137(322-112)231-19-11-129(194)210-177(231)264)339-359(282,378)301-57-110-92(30-139(320-110)233-21-13-131(196)212-179(233)266)341-361(284,380)308-66-119-99(37-147(329-119)241-49-82(4)166(255)224-187(241)274)347-366(289,385)306-62-115-96(34-143(325-115)237-25-17-135(200)216-183(237)270)345-365(288,384)316-73-126-107(45-155(336-126)249-78-208-158-162(249)218-175(203)220-173(158)262)356-375(298,394)314-65-118-97(35-145(328-118)239-47-80(2)164(253)222-185(239)272)346-357(280,376)299-56-109-88(251)26-136(319-109)230-18-10-128(193)209-176(230)263/h10-25,46-54,75-78,88-127,136-155,250-251H,26-45,55-74H2,1-9H3,(H,280,376)(H,281,377)(H,282,378)(H,283,379)(H,284,380)(H,285,381)(H,286,382)(H,287,383)(H,288,384)(H,289,385)(H,290,386)(H,291,387)(H,292,388)(H,293,389)(H,294,390)(H,295,391)(H,296,392)(H,297,393)(H,298,394)(H2,193,209,263)(H2,194,210,264)(H2,195,211,265)(H2,196,212,266)(H2,197,213,267)(H2,198,214,268)(H2,199,215,269)(H2,200,216,270)(H2,201,204,205)(H,221,252,271)(H,222,253,272)(H,223,254,273)(H,224,255,274)(H,225,256,275)(H,226,257,276)(H,227,258,277)(H,228,259,278)(H,229,260,279)(H3,202,217,219,261)(H3,203,218,220,262)/t88-,89-,90-,91-,92-,93-,94-,95-,96-,97-,98-,99-,100-,101-,102-,103-,104-,105-,106-,107-,108+,109+,110+,111+,112+,113+,114+,115+,116+,117+,118+,119+,120+,121+,122+,123+,124+,125+,126+,127+,136+,137+,138+,139+,140+,141+,142+,143+,144+,145+,146+,147+,148+,149+,150+,151+,152+,153+,154+,155+,357?,358?,359?,360?,361?,362?,363?,364?,365?,366?,367?,368?,369?,370?,371?,372?,373?,374?,375?/m0/s1 Key: XOHQPRNFRWNWQW-NYUPDZBEBZ
- SMILES: Cc1cn(c(=O)[nH]c1=O)[C@H]2C[C@@H]([C@H](O2)CO)OP(=O)(OC[C@@H]3[C@H](C[C@@H](O3)n4cc(c(=O)[nH]c4=O)C)OP(=O)(OC[C@@H]5[C@H](C[C@@H](O5)n6cnc7c6nc([nH]c7=O)N)OP(=O)(OC[C@@H]8[C@H](C[C@@H](O8)n9ccc(nc9=O)N)OP(=O)(OC[C@@H]1[C@H](C[C@@H](O1)n1cc(c(=O)[nH]c1=O)C)OP(=O)(OC[C@@H]1[C@H](C[C@@H](O1)n1cc(c(=O)[nH]c1=O)C)OP(=O)(OC[C@@H]1[C@H](C[C@@H](O1)n1ccc(nc1=O)N)OP(=O)(OC[C@@H]1[C@H](C[C@@H](O1)n1ccc(nc1=O)N)OP(=O)(OC[C@@H]1[C@H](C[C@@H](O1)n1cnc2c1ncnc2N)OP(=O)(OC[C@@H]1[C@H](C[C@@H](O1)n1cc(c(=O)[nH]c1=O)C)OP(=O)(OC[C@@H]1[C@H](C[C@@H](O1)n1ccc(nc1=O)N)OP(=O)(OC[C@@H]1[C@H](C[C@@H](O1)n1cc(c(=O)[nH]c1=O)C)OP(=O)(OC[C@@H]1[C@H](C[C@@H](O1)n1cc(c(=O)[nH]c1=O)C)OP(=O)(OC[C@@H]1[C@H](C[C@@H](O1)n1ccc(nc1=O)N)OP(=O)(OC[C@@H]1[C@H](C[C@@H](O1)n1ccc(nc1=O)N)OP(=O)(OC[C@@H]1[C@H](C[C@@H](O1)n1cc(c(=O)[nH]c1=O)C)OP(=O)(OC[C@@H]1[C@H](C[C@@H](O1)n1ccc(nc1=O)N)OP(=O)(OC[C@@H]1[C@H](C[C@@H](O1)n1cnc2c1nc([nH]c2=O)N)OP(=O)(OC[C@@H]1[C@H](C[C@@H](O1)n1cc(c(=O)[nH]c1=O)C)OP(=O)(OC[C@@H]1[C@H](C[C@@H](O1)n1ccc(nc1=O)N)O)S)S)S)S)S)S)S)S)S)S)S)S)S)S)S)S)S)S)S

Properties
Chemical formula	C_{192}H_{250}N_{57}O_{107}P_{19}S_{19}
Molar mass	6266.05 g·mol^{−1}
- Except where otherwise noted, data are given for materials in their standard state (at 25 °C [77 °F], 100 kPa). Infobox references

Afovirsen is an oligonucleotide capable of antisense interactions with mRNA of human papillomavirus. It has been investigated as a tool for diagnostics and therapeutics.

== Nucleic acid sequence ==
Afovirsen is a synthetic 20 member oligonucleotide with phosphorothioate linkages (which are resistant to degradation by nucleases) and has the sequence:

- 5'-TTG CTT CCA TCT TCC TCG TC-3'
