= RNA-dominant disease =

RNA-dominant diseases are characterized by deleterious mutations that typically result in degenerative disorders affecting various neurological, cardiovascular, and muscular functions. Studies have found that they arise from repetitive non-coding RNA sequences, also known as toxic RNA, which inhibit RNA-binding proteins leading to pathogenic effects. The most studied RNA-dominant diseases include, but are not limited to, myotonic dystrophy and fragile X-associated tremor/ataxia syndrome (FXTAS).

== Cause ==
The cause of these diseases has been found to conventionally be expanded repetitions of CNG or NCNG nucleotide sequences in non-coding RNA. For example, myotonic dystrophy type 1 (DM1) results from the repetition of RNA base pairs CUG transcribed from a region of the DMPK gene, while myotonic dystrophy type 2 (DM2) is derived from an expanded CCUG sequence repeat. Similarly, FXTAS results from CGG repeats transcribed from a region in the FMR1 gene encoding protein, and spinocerebellar ataxia (SCA) results from CAG repetition transcribed in various genes. Furthermore, frontotemporal dementia (FTD) and amyotrophic lateral sclerosis (ALS) have been found to develop from the repeated GGGGCC sequence transcribed from an intron in the C90RF72 gene. These toxic RNA sequences consist of a varying number of repeats and have been observed to construct intermolecular hairpin structures which slow their decay and allow them the functionality to interact with proteins inducing irregular splicing. It is generally noted that overall variation in the expression of affected genes and the number of repeat sequences of the RNA have little to do with the pathogenic consequences, but rather it is the gain of organizational and catalytic functions of the mutant RNA, which is similar to that of mutant proteins, that causes the toxicity.

== Treatment ==
There are currently no established treatments, but, one study, focused on myotonic dystrophy type 1, suggests that the use of antisense oligonucleotides (ASOs) known as gapmers can aid in decreasing the mutant RNA repeat transcripts. In the study, the gapmers tested contained specific modified nucleic acids which target Ribonuclease and prompted H-mediated cleaving of intended RNA sequences. Specifically, the use of CAG gapmers showed significant decrease of toxic RNA in cell cultures and a slightly less significant decrease in a test of mouse skeletal muscle. The study also noted that ASO treatment can result in possible muscular damage, but had reason to suggest that further research of antisense technology would result in reduced effect.

== Prognosis ==
Toxic RNA can lead to a vast range of medical effects including those of insulin resistance, tumors, muscular wasting seen in myotonic dystrophies, impairment of motor skills seen in FXTAS, a variety neurodegenerative syndromes, and more. Treatment has been suggested for some of these RNA-dominant diseases while others are still considered incurable.
