= Aganirsen =

Names
- IUPAC name all-P-ambo-P-thiothymidylyl-(3′→5′)-2′-deoxy-P-thioadenylyl-(3′→5′)-P-thiothymidylyl-(3′→5′)-2′-deoxy-P-thiocytidylyl-(3′→5′)-2′-deoxy-P-thiocytidylyl-(3′→5′)-2′-deoxy-P-thioguanylyl-(3′→5′)-2′-deoxy-P-thioguanylyl-(3′→5′)-2′-deoxy-P-thioadenylyl-(3′→5′)-2′-deoxy-P-thioguanylyl-(3′→5′)-2′-deoxy-P-thioguanylyl-(3′→5′)-2′-deoxy-P-thioguanylyl-(3′→5′)-2′-deoxy-P-thiocytidylyl-(3′→5′)-P-thiothymidylyl-(3′→5′)-2′-deoxy-P-thiocytidylyl-(3′→5′)-2′-deoxy-P-thioguanylyl-(3′→5′)-2′-deoxy-P-thiocytidylyl-(3′→5′)-2′-deoxy-P-thiocytidylyl-(3′→5′)-2′-deoxy-P-thioadenylyl-(3′→5′)-P-thiothymidylyl-(3′→5′)-2′-deoxy-P-thioguanylyl-(3′→5′)-2′-deoxy-P-thiocytidylyl-(3′→5′)-P-thiothymidylyl-(3′→5′)-2′-deoxy-P-thioguanylyl-(3′→5′)-2′-deoxy-P-thiocytidylyl-(3′→5′)-thymidine

Identifiers
CAS Number	1146887-67-3
3D model (JSmol)	Interactive image
ChEMBL	ChEMBL2108296
ChemSpider	44255204
DrugBank	DB15369
UNII	0N3FY8225K
- InChI: InChI=1S/C242H307N91O127P24S24/c1-93-48-317(237(358)303-207(93)336)157-23-99(335)125(413-157)55-388-461(364,485)438-101-25-158(309-15-7-149(243)279-229(309)350)414-126(101)56-394-474(377,498)454-117-41-175(327-86-272-186-200(327)288-222(255)296-214(186)343)431-143(117)73-406-472(375,496)448-111-35-169(321-52-97(5)211(340)307-241(321)362)423-135(111)65-399-466(369,490)442-105-29-162(313-19-11-153(247)283-233(313)354)420-132(105)62-396-476(379,500)455-118-42-176(328-87-273-187-201(328)289-223(256)297-215(187)344)432-144(118)74-407-473(376,497)449-112-36-170(322-53-98(6)212(341)308-242(322)363)425-137(112)67-401-479(382,503)451-114-38-172(324-83-269-183-194(252)263-80-266-197(183)324)427-139(114)69-402-467(370,491)443-106-30-163(314-20-12-154(248)284-234(314)355)415-127(106)57-390-464(367,488)440-103-27-160(311-17-9-151(245)281-231(311)352)419-131(103)61-395-475(378,499)453-116-40-174(326-85-271-185-199(326)287-221(254)295-213(185)342)429-141(116)71-404-469(372,493)445-108-32-165(316-22-14-156(250)286-236(316)357)418-130(108)60-393-470(373,494)446-109-33-167(319-50-95(3)209(338)305-239(319)360)422-134(109)64-398-465(368,489)441-104-28-161(312-18-10-152(246)282-232(312)353)421-133(104)63-397-477(380,501)456-119-43-177(329-88-274-188-202(329)290-224(257)298-216(188)345)434-146(119)76-409-483(386,507)460-123-47-181(333-92-278-192-206(333)294-228(261)302-220(192)349)436-148(123)78-411-484(387,508)459-122-46-180(332-91-277-191-205(332)293-227(260)301-219(191)348)433-145(122)75-408-480(383,504)452-115-39-173(325-84-270-184-195(253)264-81-267-198(184)325)428-140(115)70-403-481(384,505)457-121-45-179(331-90-276-190-204(331)292-226(259)300-218(190)347)435-147(121)77-410-482(385,506)458-120-44-178(330-89-275-189-203(330)291-225(258)299-217(189)346)430-142(120)72-405-468(371,492)444-107-31-164(315-21-13-155(249)285-235(315)356)416-128(107)58-391-463(366,487)439-102-26-159(310-16-8-150(244)280-230(310)351)417-129(102)59-392-471(374,495)447-110-34-168(320-51-96(4)210(339)306-240(320)361)424-136(110)66-400-478(381,502)450-113-37-171(323-82-268-182-193(251)262-79-265-196(182)323)426-138(113)68-389-462(365,486)437-100-24-166(412-124(100)54-334)318-49-94(2)208(337)304-238(318)359/h7-22,48-53,79-92,99-148,157-181,334-335H,23-47,54-78H2,1-6H3,(H,364,485)(H,365,486)(H,366,487)(H,367,488)(H,368,489)(H,369,490)(H,370,491)(H,371,492)(H,372,493)(H,373,494)(H,374,495)(H,375,496)(H,376,497)(H,377,498)(H,378,499)(H,379,500)(H,380,501)(H,381,502)(H,382,503)(H,383,504)(H,384,505)(H,385,506)(H,386,507)(H,387,508)(H2,243,279,350)(H2,244,280,351)(H2,245,281,352)(H2,246,282,353)(H2,247,283,354)(H2,248,284,355)(H2,249,285,356)(H2,250,286,357)(H2,251,262,265)(H2,252,263,266)(H2,253,264,267)(H,303,336,358)(H,304,337,359)(H,305,338,360)(H,306,339,361)(H,307,340,362)(H,308,341,363)(H3,254,287,295,342)(H3,255,288,296,343)(H3,256,289,297,344)(H3,257,290,298,345)(H3,258,291,299,346)(H3,259,292,300,347)(H3,260,293,301,348)(H3,261,294,302,349)/t99-,100-,101-,102-,103-,104-,105-,106-,107-,108-,109-,110-,111-,112-,113-,114-,115-,116-,117-,118-,119-,120-,121-,122-,123-,124+,125+,126+,127+,128+,129+,130+,131+,132+,133+,134+,135+,136+,137+,138+,139+,140+,141+,142+,143+,144+,145+,146+,147+,148+,157+,158+,159+,160+,161+,162+,163+,164+,165+,166+,167+,168+,169+,170+,171+,172+,173+,174+,175+,176+,177+,178+,179+,180+,181+,461?,462?,463?,464?,465?,466?,467?,468?,469?,470?,471?,472?,473?,474?,475?,476?,477?,478?,479?,480?,481?,482?,483?,484?/m0/s1 Key: SNEQLNWOYNYOKB-QHTNWHDRSA-N
- SMILES: Cc1cn(c(=O)[nH]c1=O)[C@H]2C[C@@H]([C@H](O2)COP(=O)(O[C@H]3C[C@@H](O[C@@H]3COP(=O)(O[C@H]4C[C@@H](O[C@@H]4COP(=O)(O[C@H]5C[C@@H](O[C@@H]5COP(=O)(O[C@H]6C[C@@H](O[C@@H]6COP(=O)(O[C@H]7C[C@@H](O[C@@H]7COP(=O)(O[C@H]8C[C@@H](O[C@@H]8COP(=O)(O[C@H]9C[C@@H](O[C@@H]9COP(=O)(O[C@H]1C[C@@H](O[C@@H]1COP(=O)(O[C@H]1C[C@@H](O[C@@H]1COP(=O)(O[C@H]1C[C@@H](O[C@@H]1COP(=O)(O[C@H]1C[C@@H](O[C@@H]1COP(=O)(O[C@H]1C[C@@H](O[C@@H]1COP(=O)(O[C@H]1C[C@@H](O[C@@H]1COP(=O)(O[C@H]1C[C@@H](O[C@@H]1COP(=O)(O[C@H]1C[C@@H](O[C@@H]1COP(=O)(O[C@H]1C[C@@H](O[C@@H]1COP(=O)(O[C@H]1C[C@@H](O[C@@H]1COP(=O)(O[C@H]1C[C@@H](O[C@@H]1COP(=O)(O[C@H]1C[C@@H](O[C@@H]1COP(=O)(O[C@H]1C[C@@H](O[C@@H]1COP(=O)(O[C@H]1C[C@@H](O[C@@H]1COP(=O)(O[C@H]1C[C@@H](O[C@@H]1COP(=O)(O[C@H]1C[C@@H](O[C@@H]1COP(=O)(O[C@H]1C[C@@H](O[C@@H]1CO)n1cc(c(=O)[nH]c1=O)C)S)n1cnc2c1ncnc2N)S)n1cc(c(=O)[nH]c1=O)C)S)n1ccc(nc1=O)N)S)n1ccc(nc1=O)N)S)n1cnc2c1nc([nH]c2=O)N)S)n1cnc2c1nc([nH]c2=O)N)S)n1cnc2c1ncnc2N)S)n1cnc2c1nc([nH]c2=O)N)S)n1cnc2c1nc([nH]c2=O)N)S)n1cnc2c1nc([nH]c2=O)N)S)n1ccc(nc1=O)N)S)n1cc(c(=O)[nH]c1=O)C)S)n1ccc(nc1=O)N)S)n1cnc2c1nc([nH]c2=O)N)S)n1ccc(nc1=O)N)S)n1ccc(nc1=O)N)S)n1cnc2c1ncnc2N)S)n1cc(c(=O)[nH]c1=O)C)S)n1cnc2c1nc([nH]c2=O)N)S)n1ccc(nc1=O)N)S)n1cc(c(=O)[nH]c1=O)C)S)n1cnc2c1nc([nH]c2=O)N)S)n1ccc(nc1=O)N)S)O

Properties
Chemical formula	C_{242}H_{307}N_{91}O_{127}P_{24}S_{24}
Molar mass	8035.44 g·mol^{−1}
- Except where otherwise noted, data are given for materials in their standard state (at 25 °C [77 °F], 100 kPa). Infobox references

Aganirsen (previously GS-101) is a 25-mer DNA antisense oligonucleotide therapeutic inhibiting insulin receptor substrate-1 (IRS-1), which is being investigated as a topical treatment for ocular neovascularization. Aganirsen is a candidate for the treatment of ocular neovascularization in patients with front of the eye (cornea) or back of the eye (retinal) diseases, including progressive corneal neovascularization in patients with infectious keratitis and wet age related macular degeneration (AMD).

Aganirsen actively inhibits the production of IRS-1 by binding IRS-1 mRNA (antisense therapy). Aganirsen therefore induces an upstream inhibition of the neovascularization pathway, most notably by inhibiting excess VEGF and interleukin-1β expression.

== Structure ==
Aganirsen is a 25-mer first-generation antisense oligonucleotide (phosphorothioate linkage) with the following sequence:

- 5'-TAT CCG GAG GGC TCG CCA TGC TGC T-3'

Aganirsen has a molecular mass of 8036 Da, a melting point of approximately 64.2 °C, and a GC content of 64%. Aganirsen is highly soluble in water.

== Mechanism of action ==
IRS-1 is an intracellular docking protein deprived of enzymatic activity. IRS-1 is overexpressed in endothelial cells under neovascularization conditions. IRS-1 has been suggested as a target for the regulation of angiogenesis mediated by hypoxia, insulin and inflammation.

IRS-1's main function is to act as a signal transmitter for intracellular pathways. IRS-1mainly interacts with the angiogenesis pathway by interacting with the VEGF-receptor complex. Aganirsen therefore reduces angiogenesis by inhibiting VEGF and inflammatory cytokines production upstream by specifically targeting IRS-1 mRNA.

== Clinical development ==
The drug was discovered by S. Al-Mahmood, in Paris, France and then developed to Phase III in progressive corneal neovascularisation in patients with infectious keratitis and on the waiting list for Corneal Graft replacement (an EU Orphan Drug designation). The dose-dependent effect of topical Aganirsen on Choroidal Neovascularization has also been evaluated in a non-human primate (NHP) laser-induced model of wet-AMD. Aganirsen has also been investigated in Psoriasis, where it was found that lesion size reduction was associated with reduced expression of IRS-1 (P < 0.01), TNFα (P < 0.0001), and vascular endothelial growth factor (P < 0.01).

In April 2007, the EMA's Committee for Orphan Medicinal Products (COMP) granted Gene Signal orphan designation for aganirsen for the prevention of corneal graft rejection associated with excessive neovascularisation of the host cornea (EMEA/COMP/108186/2007). In April 2014, the EMA also granted Aganirsen an Orphan drug designation for ischemic Central retinal vein Occlusion (iCRVO). A randomised, double-masked, 3-group, placebo-controlled trial (STRONG Study) has received European Health Directorate (FP-7) funding to assess the drug's efficacy in reducing the rate of anterior and posterior segment neovascularisation and Neovascular Glaucoma (NVG) development after ischemic CRVO.

== Delivery ==
Aganirsen is under investigation for topical delivery (eye drops and eye emulsion). Toxicology studies in rabbits and humans revealed that aganirsen was well tolerated independently of the concentration delivered.
