= Fomivirsen =

Antiviral drug

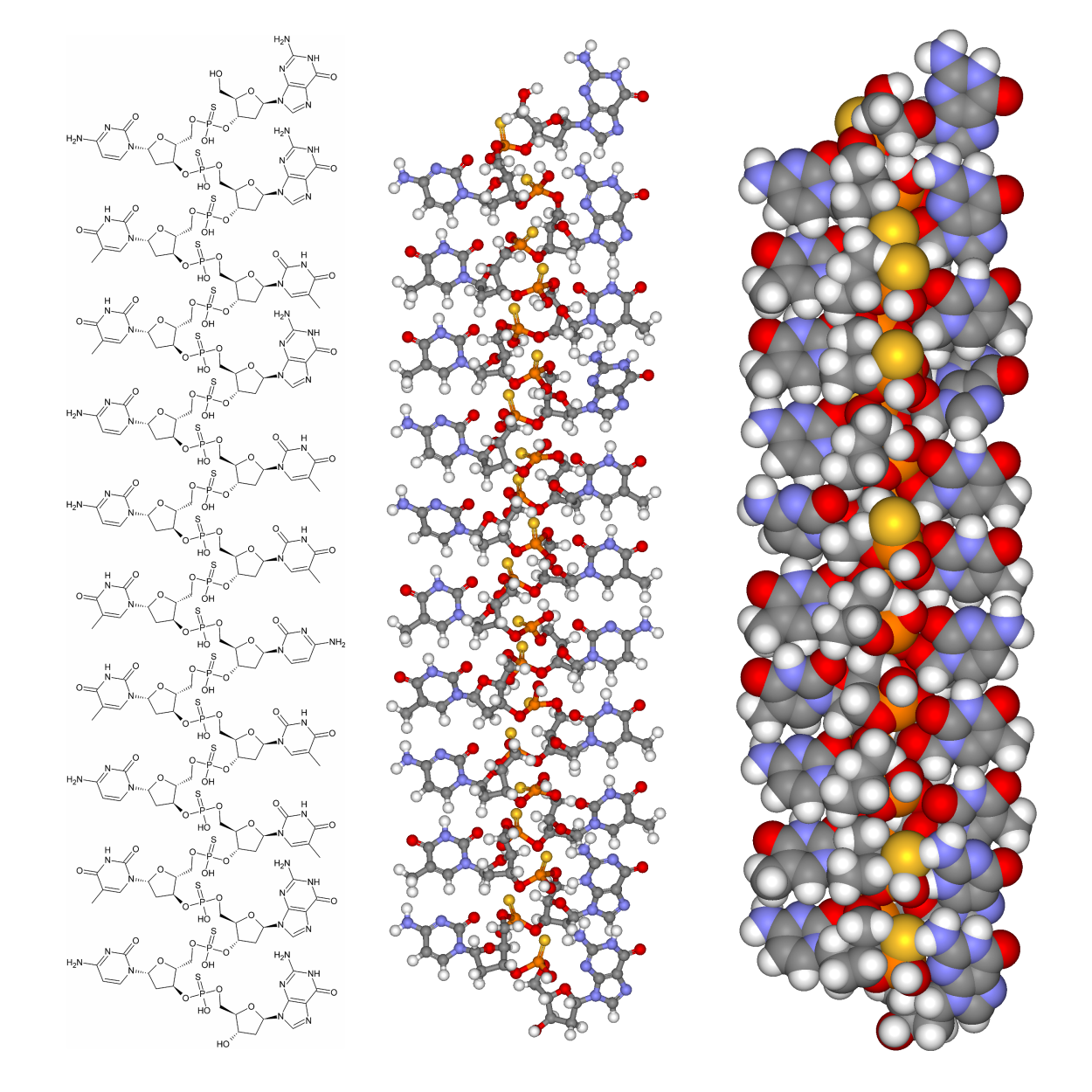

Clinical data
- Trade names: Vitravene
- AHFS/Drugs.com: Micromedex Detailed Consumer Information
- Pregnancy category: AU: B2
- Routes of administration: Intravitreal injection
- ATC code: S01AD08 (WHO)

Legal status
- Legal status: Withdrawn

Identifiers
- IUPAC name: all-P-ambo-2'-deoxy-P-thioguanylyl-(3'→5')-2'-deoxy-P-thiocytidylyl-(3'→5')-2'-deoxy-P-thioguanylyl-(3'→5')-P-thiothymidylyl-(3'→5')-P-thiothymidylyl-(3'→5')-P-thiothymidylyl-(3'→5')-2'-deoxy-P-thioguanylyl-(3'→5')-2'-deoxy-P-thiocytidylyl-(3'→5')-P-thiothymidylyl-(3'→5')-2'-deoxy-P-thiocytidylyl-(3'→5')-P-thiothymidylyl-(3'→5')-P-thiothymidylyl-(3'→5')-2'-deoxy-P-thiocytidylyl-(3'→5')-P-thiothymidylyl-(3'→5')-P-thiothymidylyl-(3'→5')-2'-deoxy-P-thiocytidylyl-(3'→5')-P-thiothymidylyl-(3'→5')-P-thiothymidylyl-(3'→5')-2'-deoxy-P-thioguanylyl-(3'→5')-2'-deoxy-P-thiocytidylyl-(3'→5')-2'-deoxyguanosine
- CAS Number: 160369-77-7
- DrugBank: DB06759
- ChemSpider: none
- UNII: 3Z6W3S36X5
- KEGG: D02736
- ChEMBL: ChEMBL1201688

Chemical and physical data
- Formula: C_{204}H_{263}N_{63}O_{114}P_{20}S_{20}
- Molar mass: 6682.35 g·mol^{−1}
- SMILES: Cc1cn([C@H]2C[C@H](OP(O)(=S)OC[C@H]3O[C@@H](n4ccc(N)nc4=O)C[C@@H]3OP(O)(=S)OC[C@H]3O[C@@H](n4cc(C)c(=O)[nH]c4=O)C[C@@H]3OP(O)(=S)OC[C@H]3O[C@@H](n4cc(C)c(=O)[nH]c4=O)C[C@@H]3OP(O)(=S)OC[C@H]3O[C@@H](n4ccc(N)nc4=O)C[C@@H]3OP(O)(=S)OC[C@H]3O[C@@H](n4cc(C)c(=O)[nH]c4=O)C[C@@H]3OP(O)(=S)OC[C@H]3O[C@@H](n4cc(C)c(=O)[nH]c4=O)C[C@@H]3OP(O)(=S)OC[C@H]3O[C@@H](n4ccc(N)nc4=O)C[C@@H]3OP(O)(=S)OC[C@H]3O[C@@H](n4cc(C)c(=O)[nH]c4=O)C[C@@H]3OP(O)(=S)OC[C@H]3O[C@@H](n4cc(C)c(=O)[nH]c4=O)C[C@@H]3OP(O)(=S)OC[C@H]3O[C@@H](n4cnc5c(=O)[nH]c(N)nc54)C[C@@H]3OP(O)(=S)OC[C@H]3O[C@@H](n4ccc(N)nc4=O)C[C@@H]3OP(O)(=S)OC[C@H]3O[C@@H](n4cnc5c(=O)[nH]c(N)nc54)C[C@@H]3O)[C@@H](COP(O)(=S)O[C@H]3C[C@H](n4ccc(N)nc4=O)O[C@@H]3COP(O)(=S)O[C@H]3C[C@H](n4cnc5c(=O)[nH]c(N)nc54)O[C@@H]3COP(O)(=S)O[C@H]3C[C@H](n4cc(C)c(=O)[nH]c4=O)O[C@@H]3COP(O)(=S)O[C@H]3C[C@H](n4cc(C)c(=O)[nH]c4=O)O[C@@H]3COP(O)(=S)O[C@H]3C[C@H](n4cc(C)c(=O)[nH]c4=O)O[C@@H]3COP(O)(=S)O[C@H]3C[C@H](n4cnc5c(=O)[nH]c(N)nc54)O[C@@H]3COP(O)(=S)O[C@H]3C[C@H](n4ccc(N)nc4=O)O[C@@H]3COP(O)(=S)O[C@H]3C[C@H](n4cnc5c(=O)[nH]c(N)nc54)O[C@@H]3CO)O2)c(=O)[nH]c1=O
- InChI: InChI=1S/C204H263N63O114P20S20/c1-80-44-253(195(291)237-169(80)270)145-31-98(119(349-145)62-328-387(306,407)367-97-30-144(252-22-16-137(210)226-194(252)290)348-118(97)61-327-400(319,420)380-109-42-157(266-78-219-162-167(266)230-187(214)235-182(162)283)361-131(109)74-340-398(317,418)378-107-40-154(262-53-89(10)178(279)246-204(262)300)357-127(107)70-336-395(314,415)375-104-37-151(259-50-86(7)175(276)243-201(259)297)355-125(104)68-334-396(315,416)376-105-38-152(260-51-87(8)176(277)244-202(260)298)358-128(105)71-337-401(320,421)381-110-43-158(267-79-220-163-168(267)231-188(215)236-183(163)284)359-129(110)72-338-388(307,408)368-93-26-140(248-18-12-133(206)222-190(248)286)343-113(93)56-322-383(302,403)362-91-24-155(341-111(91)54-268)264-76-217-160-165(264)228-185(212)233-180(160)281)369-389(308,409)323-58-115-94(27-141(345-115)249-19-13-134(207)223-191(249)287)364-384(303,404)329-63-120-101(34-148(350-120)256-47-83(4)172(273)240-198(256)294)372-392(311,412)332-66-123-99(32-146(353-123)254-45-81(2)170(271)238-196(254)292)370-390(309,410)324-59-116-95(28-142(346-116)250-20-14-135(208)224-192(250)288)365-385(304,405)330-64-121-102(35-149(351-121)257-48-84(5)173(274)241-199(257)295)373-393(312,413)333-67-124-100(33-147(354-124)255-46-82(3)171(272)239-197(255)293)371-391(310,411)325-60-117-96(29-143(347-117)251-21-15-136(209)225-193(251)289)366-386(305,406)331-65-122-103(36-150(352-122)258-49-85(6)174(275)242-200(258)296)374-394(313,414)335-69-126-106(39-153(356-126)261-52-88(9)177(278)245-203(261)299)377-397(316,417)339-73-130-108(41-156(360-130)265-77-218-161-166(265)229-186(213)234-181(161)282)379-399(318,419)326-57-114-92(25-139(344-114)247-17-11-132(205)221-189(247)285)363-382(301,402)321-55-112-90(269)23-138(342-112)263-75-216-159-164(263)227-184(211)232-179(159)280/h11-22,44-53,75-79,90-131,138-158,268-269H,23-43,54-74H2,1-10H3,(H,301,402)(H,302,403)(H,303,404)(H,304,405)(H,305,406)(H,306,407)(H,307,408)(H,308,409)(H,309,410)(H,310,411)(H,311,412)(H,312,413)(H,313,414)(H,314,415)(H,315,416)(H,316,417)(H,317,418)(H,318,419)(H,319,420)(H,320,421)(H2,205,221,285)(H2,206,222,286)(H2,207,223,287)(H2,208,224,288)(H2,209,225,289)(H2,210,226,290)(H,237,270,291)(H,238,271,292)(H,239,272,293)(H,240,273,294)(H,241,274,295)(H,242,275,296)(H,243,276,297)(H,244,277,298)(H,245,278,299)(H,246,279,300)(H3,211,227,232,280)(H3,212,228,233,281)(H3,213,229,234,282)(H3,214,230,235,283)(H3,215,231,236,284)/t90-,91-,92-,93-,94-,95-,96-,97-,98-,99-,100-,101-,102-,103-,104-,105-,106-,107-,108-,109-,110-,111+,112+,113+,114+,115+,116+,117+,118+,119+,120+,121+,122+,123+,124+,125+,126+,127+,128+,129+,130+,131+,138+,139+,140+,141+,142+,143+,144+,145+,146+,147+,148+,149+,150+,151+,152+,153+,154+,155+,156+,157+,158+,382?,383?,384?,385?,386?,387?,388?,389?,390?,391?,392?,393?,394?,395?,396?,397?,398?,399?,400?,401?/m0/s1; Key:YXPFHXCUIFJZDH-JCSPNYBJSA-N

Fomivirsen (brand name Vitravene) is an antisense antiviral drug that was used in the treatment of cytomegalovirus retinitis (CMV) in immunocompromised patients, including those with AIDS. It was administered via intraocular injection.

It was discovered at the NIH and was licensed and initially developed by Isis Pharmaceuticals, which subsequently licensed it to Novartis. It was licensed by the FDA for CMV in Aug 1998, and was the first antisense drug that was approved.

Novartis withdrew the marketing authorization in the EU in 2002 and in the US in 2006. The drug was withdrawn because while there was a high unmet need for drugs to treat CMV when the drug was initially discovered and developed due to the CMV arising in people with AIDS, the development of HAART dramatically reduced the number of cases of CMV.

It is an antisense oligonucleotide -- a synthetic 21 member oligonucleotide with phosphorothioate linkages (which are resistant to degradation by nucleases) and has the sequence:

- 5'-GCG TTT GCT CTT CTT CTT GCG-3'

It blocks translation of viral mRNA by binding to the complementary sequence of the mRNA transcribed from the template segment of a key CMV gene UL123, which encodes the CMV protein IE2. It was the first antisense antiviral approved by the FDA.
