= C10H15N3O5 =

The molecular formula C_{10}H_{15}N_{3}O_{5} (molar mass: 257.24 g/mol, exact mass: 257.1012 u) may refer to:

- Benserazide
- 5-Methylcytidine
