= IONIS-GCCRRx =

Investigational antisense oligonucleotide

Clinical data
- Other names: ISIS-426115; ISIS-GCCR_{Rx}
- Drug class: Antiglucocorticoid

Identifiers
- IUPAC name: all-P-ambo-2'-O-(2-methoxyethyl)-P-thioguanylyl-(3'→5')-2'-O-(2-methoxyethyl)-5-methyl-P-thiocytidylyl-(3'→5')-2'-O-(2-methoxyethyl)-P-thioadenylyl-(3'→5')-2'-O-(2-methoxyethyl)-P-thioguanylyl-(3'→5')-2'-O-(2-methoxyethyl)-5-methyl-P-thiocytidylyl-(3'→5')-2'-deoxy-5-methyl-P-thiocytidylyl-(3'→5')-2'-deoxy-P-thioadenylyl-(3'→5')-P-thiothymidylyl-(3'→5')-2'-deoxy-P-thioguanylyl-(3'→5')-2'-deoxy-P-thioguanylyl-(3'→5')-P-thiothymidylyl-(3'→5')-2'-deoxy-P-thioguanylyl-(3'→5')-2'-deoxy-P-thioadenylyl-(3'→5')-P-thiothymidylyl-(3'→5')-2'-deoxy-5-methyl-P-thiocytidylyl-(3'→5')-2'-O-(2-methoxyethyl)-P-thioadenylyl-(3'→5')-2'-O-(2-methoxyethyl)-P-thioguanylyl-(3'→5')-2'-O-(2-methoxyethyl)-P-thioguanylyl-(3'→5')-2'-O-(2-methoxyethyl)-P-thioadenylyl-(3'→5')-2'-O-(2-methoxyethyl)guanosine
- PubChem SID: 404859844
- UNII: 6C4TX6T1CO

Chemical and physical data
- Formula: C_{230}H_{312}N_{83}O_{117}P_{19}S_{19}
- Molar mass: 7309.13 g·mol^{−1}
- SMILES: COCCO[C@H]1[C@@H](O[C@@H]([C@H]1OP(=S)(O)OC[C@@H]1[C@H]([C@H]([C@@H](O1)N1C(=O)N=C(N)C(=C1)C)OCCOC)OP(=S)(O)OC[C@@H]1[C@H]([C@H]([C@@H](O1)N1C=NC=2C(N)=NC=NC12)OCCOC)OP(=S)(O)OC[C@@H]1[C@H]([C@H]([C@@H](O1)N1C=NC=2C(=O)NC(N)=NC12)OCCOC)OP(=S)(O)OC[C@@H]1[C@H]([C@H]([C@@H](O1)N1C(=O)N=C(N)C(=C1)C)OCCOC)OP(=S)(O)OC[C@@H]1[C@H](C[C@@H](O1)N1C(=O)N=C(N)C(=C1)C)OP(=S)(O)OC[C@@H]1[C@H](C[C@@H](O1)N1C=NC=2C(N)=NC=NC12)OP(=S)(O)OC[C@@H]1[C@H](C[C@@H](O1)N1C(=O)NC(=O)C(C)=C1)OP(=S)(O)OC[C@@H]1[C@H](C[C@@H](O1)N1C=NC=2C(=O)NC(N)=NC12)OP(=S)(O)OC[C@@H]1[C@H](C[C@@H](O1)N1C=NC=2C(=O)NC(N)=NC12)OP(=S)(O)OC[C@@H]1[C@H](C[C@@H](O1)N1C(=O)NC(=O)C(C)=C1)OP(=S)(O)OC[C@@H]1[C@H](C[C@@H](O1)N1C=NC=2C(=O)NC(N)=NC12)OP(=S)(O)OC[C@@H]1[C@H](C[C@@H](O1)N1C=NC=2C(N)=NC=NC12)OP(=S)(O)OC[C@@H]1[C@H](C[C@@H](O1)N1C(=O)NC(=O)C(C)=C1)OP(=S)(O)OC[C@@H]1[C@H](C[C@@H](O1)N1C(=O)N=C(N)C(=C1)C)OP(=S)(O)OC[C@@H]1[C@H]([C@H]([C@@H](O1)N1C=NC=2C(N)=NC=NC12)OCCOC)OP(=S)(O)OC[C@@H]1[C@H]([C@H]([C@@H](O1)N1C=NC=2C(=O)NC(N)=NC12)OCCOC)OP(=S)(O)OC[C@@H]1[C@H]([C@H]([C@@H](O1)N1C=NC=2C(=O)NC(N)=NC12)OCCOC)OP(=S)(O)OC[C@@H]1[C@H]([C@H]([C@@H](O1)N1C=NC=2C(N)=NC=NC12)OCCOC)OP(=S)(O)OC[C@@H]1[C@H]([C@H]([C@@H](O1)N1C=NC=2C(=O)NC(N)=NC12)OCCOC)O)CO)N1C=NC=2C(=O)NC(N)=NC12
- InChI: InChI=1S/C230H312N83O117P19S19/c1-93-48-294(224(327)271-173(93)231)130-38-100(416-440(343,459)384-67-124-157(167(367-32-22-357-12)209(406-124)306-85-260-142-179(237)250-77-255-184(142)306)426-446(349,465)389-72-128-162(172(372-37-27-362-17)215(410-128)313-92-270-152-194(313)282-223(247)290-205(152)326)430-449(352,468)391-74-129-161(171(371-36-26-361-16)214(411-129)312-91-269-151-193(312)281-222(246)289-204(151)325)429-448(351,467)388-70-125-158(168(368-33-23-358-13)210(407-125)307-86-261-143-180(238)251-78-256-185(143)307)425-442(345,461)383-66-121-153(315)163(363-28-18-353-8)206(403-121)309-88-266-148-190(309)278-219(243)286-201(148)322)111(392-130)56-373-431(334,450)413-102-40-132(296-52-97(5)195(316)291-228(296)331)394-112(102)57-374-436(339,455)418-106-44-136(302-81-259-141-178(236)249-76-254-183(141)302)398-117(106)61-378-438(341,457)420-108-46-138(304-83-264-146-188(304)276-217(241)284-199(146)320)399-118(108)62-379-434(337,453)415-104-42-134(298-54-99(7)197(318)293-230(298)333)396-114(104)59-376-437(340,456)419-107-45-137(303-82-263-145-187(303)275-216(240)283-198(145)319)401-120(107)64-381-439(342,458)421-109-47-139(305-84-265-147-189(305)277-218(242)285-200(147)321)400-119(109)63-380-433(336,452)414-103-41-133(297-53-98(6)196(317)292-229(297)332)395-113(103)58-375-435(338,454)417-105-43-135(301-80-258-140-177(235)248-75-253-182(140)301)397-116(105)60-377-432(335,451)412-101-39-131(295-49-94(2)174(232)272-225(295)328)393-115(101)65-382-441(344,460)423-155-123(405-207(165(155)365-30-20-355-10)299-50-95(3)175(233)273-226(299)329)69-386-445(348,464)428-160-127(409-213(170(160)370-35-25-360-15)311-90-268-150-192(311)280-221(245)288-203(150)324)73-390-447(350,466)427-159-126(408-211(169(159)369-34-24-359-14)308-87-262-144-181(239)252-79-257-186(144)308)71-387-444(347,463)424-156-122(404-208(166(156)366-31-21-356-11)300-51-96(4)176(234)274-227(300)330)68-385-443(346,462)422-154-110(55-314)402-212(164(154)364-29-19-354-9)310-89-267-149-191(310)279-220(244)287-202(149)323/h48-54,75-92,100-139,153-172,206-215,314-315H,18-47,55-74H2,1-17H3,(H,334,450)(H,335,451)(H,336,452)(H,337,453)(H,338,454)(H,339,455)(H,340,456)(H,341,457)(H,342,458)(H,343,459)(H,344,460)(H,345,461)(H,346,462)(H,347,463)(H,348,464)(H,349,465)(H,350,466)(H,351,467)(H,352,468)(H2,231,271,327)(H2,232,272,328)(H2,233,273,329)(H2,234,274,330)(H2,235,248,253)(H2,236,249,254)(H2,237,250,255)(H2,238,251,256)(H2,239,252,257)(H,291,316,331)(H,292,317,332)(H,293,318,333)(H3,240,275,283,319)(H3,241,276,284,320)(H3,242,277,285,321)(H3,243,278,286,322)(H3,244,279,287,323)(H3,245,280,288,324)(H3,246,281,289,325)(H3,247,282,290,326)/t100-,101-,102-,103-,104-,105-,106-,107-,108-,109-,110+,111+,112+,113+,114+,115+,116+,117+,118+,119+,120+,121+,122+,123+,124+,125+,126+,127+,128+,129+,130+,131+,132+,133+,134+,135+,136+,137+,138+,139+,153+,154+,155+,156+,157+,158+,159+,160+,161+,162+,163+,164+,165+,166+,167+,168+,169+,170+,171+,172+,206+,207+,208+,209+,210+,211+,212+,213+,214+,215+,431?,432?,433?,434?,435?,436?,437?,438?,439?,440?,441?,442?,443?,444?,445?,446?,447?,448?,449?/m0/s1; Key:JXMOHJNPGFEHIA-CHGQRGNJSA-N

IONIS-GCCR_{Rx}, also known as ISIS-426115, is an antiglucocorticoid which is under development by Ionis Pharmaceuticals for the treatment of diabetes mellitus type 2. It has also been under investigation for the treatment of Cushing's syndrome, but no development has been reported. The drug is an antisense oligonucleotide against the glucocorticoid receptor. As of December 2017, it is in phase II clinical trials for diabetes mellitus type 2.
