= Phosphorothioate-based ligase-independent cloning =

Phosphorothioate-based ligase-independent cloning is a cloning method that uses the phosphorothioate chemistry as a new universal cloning starting with the target's gene and vector's amplification with PCR. It is also commonly known as the PLICing method and it consists of three main steps: amplification, cleavage and hybridization. This method is important because it is a sequence-independent method to clone DNA fragments in an easier way than the traditional way which requires the use of restriction enzymes for DNA ligase, and it is also a really high efficient method.

== Mechanism of action ==
Primers and complementary phosphothioated nucleotides are used. It requires a recombination in order of short stretch of four amino acids among proteins. In the amplification step, the vector and the target gene are amplified by PCR with primers that have a complementary phosphothioated nucleotides in the 5' end. Then, the products of the PCR are cleaved in an iodine/ethanol solution and they produce single-stranded overhangs. Finally the ends hybridize at room temperature and the transformation into competent host cells happens with the resulting DNA.

This cloning procedure is also known for being simple since it only requires one single type of enzymatic reaction. The reaction is required before transformation and it results in a high cloning efficiency, with the elimination of the nonrecombinant clones. It was also found and proven that the minimal length to have an efficient LIC is the 12-nucleotide ss tails. The 12-nucleotide products showed that it was cloned 5-10 times more efficiently compared to other ones with less nucleotides. The efficiency of the LIC is dependent on the length of the cohesive ends and the procedures used to purify the inserts. In another study, it was also found that by having the 12-nucleotide, it permitted the formation of stable duplexes containing cohesive tails and it also eliminated the ligation step. Along with the cloning process being more efficient the process takes significant less time and no further steps need to be taken to get the final product.

In the traditional way, there was not enzymatic activities after DNA was amplified/purified, but with this new cloning method, enzymatic activities are present which helps generating the libraries. Also, in the past it DNA cloning was known to be a really slow step, something that changed completed after the Phosphotothioate-based ligase-independent cloning method was created thanks to the appearance of enzyme/ligase-free type of method.

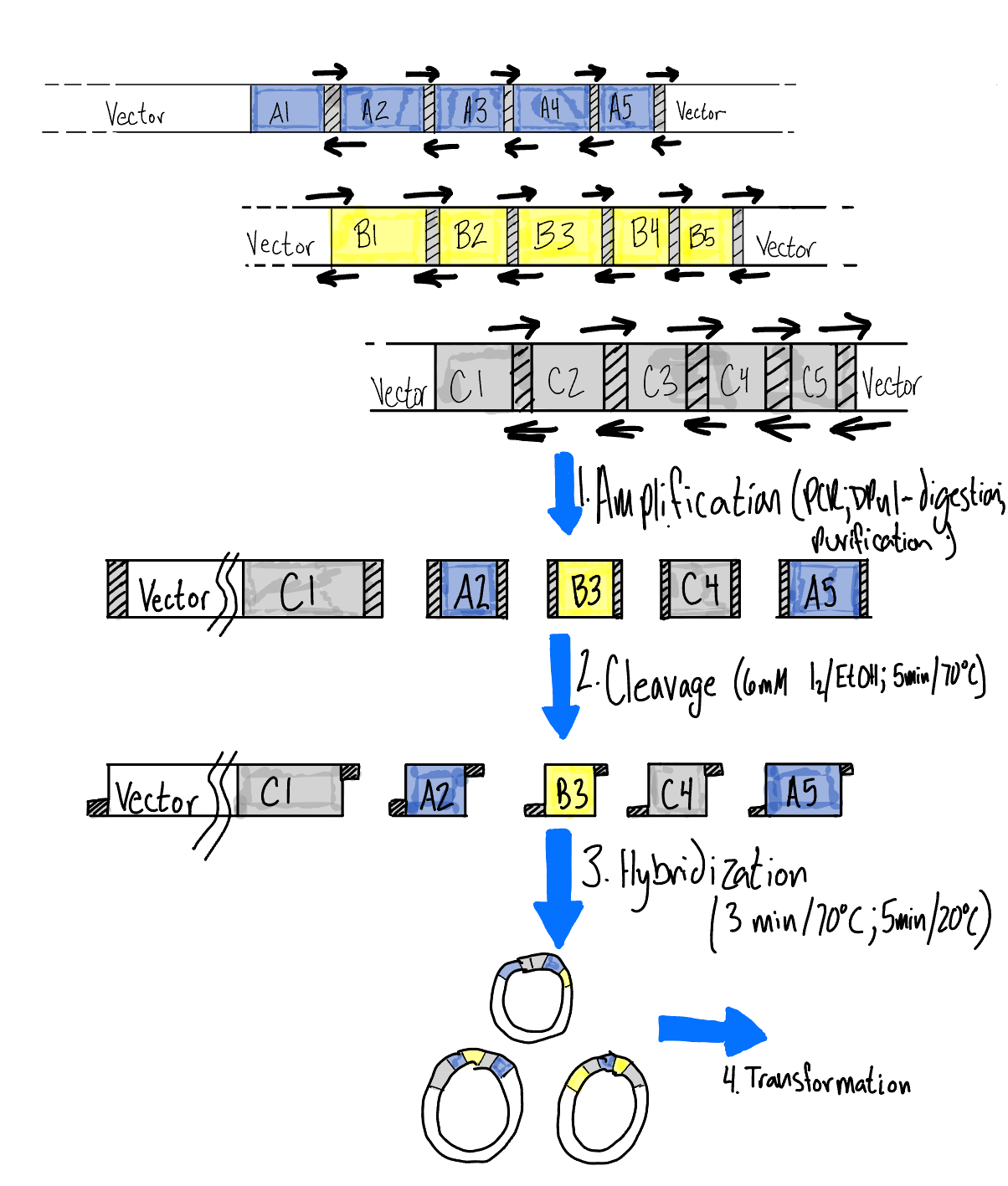
The four steps of PTRec: 1. Amplification of domains, 2. Cleavage to generate single-stranded overhands at the end sites, 3. Single tube recombination and hybridization of DNA fragments, 4. Transformation of plasmid into bacterial cells.

== Industrial applications ==
Thanks to this method, several industries were able to utilize the effectivity and efficiency of it to create and produce for example plant natural products. By being able to do a DNA sequencing in a faster way and by using those biosynthetic pathways, plant natural products are able to be produced by specific compounds produced by those pathways.

== Medical applications ==
In the medical area, it was found that the ligase-independent cloning can potentially be used to help with screening applications, as well as the rapid generation of viruses like Influenza for research and the development of vaccines. Studies have shown that this form of cloning also has led to further the study of protein function.

== Importance and significance ==
This method has a lot of advantages since it is an enzyme-free method that only requires a short stretch of four amino acids in order to define and get a single crossover point. It is easier and cheaper since only four amino acids are used along with the reagents PLICing, making it twelve times cheaper compared to standard restriction cloning.

== History ==
Standard cloning techniques often require long incubation and long processes. Ligation independent cloning (LIC) which was developed in the 1990's was used to help resolve some of these issues. The majority of these LIC techniques still had their own restrictions. In 2010, a group of scientists: Milan Blanusa, Alexander Schenk, Hengameh Sadeghi, Jan Marienhagen, and Ulrich Schwaneberg who were associated with Jacobs University Bremen in Germany worked to develop a process that was both an enzyme-free and sequence-independent known as Phosphorothioate-based ligase-independent gene cloning, or PLICing for short.
