= Immune stimulating antibody conjugate =

Monoclonal antibody

An Immune stimulating antibody conjugate is a monoclonal antibody that conjugates an antibody to an immune-stimulatory agent. They have been used in targeting tumors in mouse models, particularly to turn "cold tumors into hot ones". Immune stimulating antibody conjugates work by activating dendritic cells within the tumor, and are capable of being delivered systemically. With some patients being resistant to checkpoint inhibitors, immune stimulating antibody conjugates may be able to harness an immune response generated through the stimulation of toll-like receptors. In mice models, "dendritic cells (DCs) [were able] to internalize tumor antigens and subsequently activate tumor-reactive T cells"; this has been used "to treat autologous and autochthonous tumors successfully".

== Example ==
An immune stimulating antibody conjugate comprising a TLR7/TLR8 dual agonist conjugated to antibodies targeting at human epidermal growth factor receptor 2(HER2) has been developed. Mechanically, immune stimulating antibody conjugates required tumor antigen recognition, FcγR-dependent phagocytosis and TLR-mediated activation to drive tumor killing by myeloid cells and subsequent T-cell-mediated antitumor immunity.

== See also ==
- List of therapeutic monoclonal antibodies
