= Antisense therapy =

Form of treatment for genetic disorders and other illnesses

Antisense therapy is a form of treatment that uses antisense oligonucleotides (ASOs) to target messenger RNA (mRNA). ASOs are capable of altering mRNA expression through a variety of mechanisms, including ribonuclease H mediated decay of the pre-mRNA, direct steric blockage, and exon content modulation through splicing site binding on pre-mRNA. Several ASOs have been approved in the United States, the European Union, and elsewhere.

== Nomenclature ==
The common stem for antisense oligonucleotides drugs is -rsen. The substem -virsen designates antiviral antisense oligonucleotides.

== Antisense oligonucleotide development ==
Developments in ASO modification are separated into three generations. Generation one is called backbone-modified and focuses on the phosphodiester group of the nucleotide. This impacts inter-nucleotide binding. These modifications led to better distribution, reduced urinary excretion, and prolonged residence time of the ASOs in the cell. Some examples of first generation modifications include the addition of a phosphorothioate group (PS), methyl group, or nitrogen. The most common is the phosphorothioate group (PS) in which the oxygen atoms of a phosphodiester group are replaced with sulfur atoms, greatly improving efficacy and reducing degradation. Generation two is sugar-modified, focused on the ribose sugar of the nucleotide. This generation saw improved binding affinity while reducing degradation. Some examples of generation two modifications are the substitution of R group with morpholine group (MO) and the usage of phosphorodiamidate morpholino oligomer (PMO) and thiomorpholine oligomer (TMO) as linkages between the ribose sugar and phosphodiester group in the backbone. Generation three is nucleobase-modified, the least common type of modification. These modifications enhanced binding affinity and cell penetration while reducing degradation and off-target effects. Examples include the introduction of G-clamps, pseudoisocytosine, and the substitution of bases with amine, thione, halogen, alkyl, alkenyl, or alkynyl groups.

== Pharmacokinetics and pharmacodynamics ==
=== Half-life and stability ===
ASO-based drugs employ highly modified, single-stranded chains of synthetic nucleic acids that achieve wide tissue distribution with very long half-lives. For instance, many ASO-based drugs contain phosphorothioate substitutions and 2' sugar modifications to inhibit nuclease degradation enabling vehicle-free delivery to cells.

=== In vivo delivery ===
Phosphorothioate ASOs can be delivered to cells without the need of a delivery vehicle. ASOs do not penetrate the blood brain barrier when delivered systemically but they can distribute across the neuraxis if injected in the cerebrospinal fluid typically by intrathecal administration. Newer formulations using conjugated ligands greatly enhances delivery efficiency and cell-type specific targeting.

== Approved therapies ==
=== Amyotrophic lateral sclerosis ===
Tofersen (marketed as Qalsody) was approved by the FDA for the treatment of SOD1- associated amyotrophic lateral sclerosis (ALS) in 2023. It was developed by Biogen under a licensing agreement with Ionis Pharmaceuticals. In trials the drug was found to lower levels of an ALS biomarker, neurofilament light chain, and in long-term trial extensions to slow disease. Under the terms of the FDA's accelerated approval program, a confirmatory study will be conducted in presymptomatic gene carriers to provide additional evidence.

=== Batten disease ===
Milasen is a novel individualized therapeutic agent that was designed and approved by the FDA for the treatment of Batten disease. This therapy serves as an example of personalized medicine.

In 2019, a report was published detailing the development of milasen, an antisense oligonucleotide drug for Batten disease, under an expanded-access investigational clinical protocol authorized by the Food and Drug Administration (FDA). Milasen "itself remains an investigational drug, and it is not suited for the treatment of other patients with Batten's disease" because it was customized for a single patient's specific mutation. However it is an example of individualized genomic medicine therapeutical intervention.

=== Cytomegalovirus retinitis ===
Fomivirsen (marketed as Vitravene), was approved by the U.S. FDA in August 1998, as a treatment for cytomegalovirus retinitis.

=== Duchenne muscular dystrophy ===
Several morpholino oligos have been approved to treat specific groups of mutations causing Duchenne muscular dystrophy. In September 2016, eteplirsen (ExonDys51) received FDA approval for the treatment of cases that can benefit from skipping exon 51 of the dystrophin transcript. In December 2019, golodirsen (Vyondys 53) received FDA approval for the treatment of cases that can benefit from skipping exon 53 of the dystrophin transcript. In August 2020, viltolarsen (Viltepso) received FDA approval for the treatment of cases that can benefit from skipping exon 53 of the dystrophin transcript.

=== Epilepsy of Infancy with Migrating Focal Seizures (EIMFS) ===
Valeriasen is an investigational antisense oligonucleotide designed to reduce expression of KCNT1, a gene encoding the sodium-activated potassium channel K_{Na}1.1 Pathogenic gain-of-function variants in KCNT1 are associated with developmental and epileptic encephalopathy, including epilepsy of infancy with migrating focal seizures (EIMFS), a severe early-life epilepsy syndrome characterized by treatment-resistant seizures, developmental impairment, and increased childhood mortality. The therapeutic strategy uses an RNase H–activating RNA-targeted therapy to knock down KCNT1 transcript levels rather than correcting a specific variant at the DNA level. In 2026, Nakayama et al reported intrathecal administration of valeriasen in two children with severe KCNT1 p.Arg474His-associated EIMFS under an investigational clinical protocol. Treatment was associated with reductions in seizure frequency and severity, but ventricular enlargement or hydrocephalus was observed in both patients, indicating a potential safety concern for some intrathecally delivered knockdown ASOs.

A companion human translational study by Golinski et al. investigated the developmental biology and preclinical feasibility of KCNT1 knockdown in utero. The study reported functional K_{Na}1.1 conductance in prenatal and neonatal human brain tissue, gain-of-function potassium currents in patient-derived excitatory and inhibitory neurons, and that ASO-mediated knockdown altered firing in mid-gestation primary human neurons, supporting the hypothesis that KCNT1-targeted ASO therapy may act on disease-relevant neuronal physiology during early human brain development.

=== Familial chylomicronaemia syndrome ===
Volanesorsen was approved by the European Medicines Agency (EMA) for the treatment of familial chylomicronaemia syndrome in May 2019.

=== Familial hypercholesterolemia ===
In January 2013 mipomersen (marketed as Kynamro) was approved by the FDA for the treatment of homozygous familial hypercholesterolemia.

=== Hereditary transthyretin-mediated amyloidosis ===
Inotersen received FDA approval for the treatment of hereditary transthyretin-mediated amyloidosis in October 2018. The application for inotersen was granted orphan drug designation. It was developed by Ionis Pharmaceuticals and licensed to Akcea Therapeutics. Patisiran (sold under Onpattro) was developed by Alnylam Pharmaceuticals, and also approved for use in the US and EU in 2018 with orphan drug designation. Its mechanism-of-action is the active substance of small interfering RNA (siRNA), which allows it to interfere with and block the production of transthyretin. As such, it was the first FDA-approved siRNA therapeutic.

=== Spinal muscular atrophy ===
In 2004, development of an antisense therapy for spinal muscular atrophy began. Over the following years, an antisense oligonucleotide later named nusinersen was developed by Ionis Pharmaceuticals under a licensing agreement with Biogen. In December 2016, nusinersen received regulatory approval from FDA and soon after, from other regulatory agencies worldwide.

== Investigational therapies ==
=== Current clinical trials ===
As of 2020, more than 50 antisense oligonucleotides were in clinical trials, including over 25 in advanced clinical trials (phase II or III).

==== Phase III trials ====
===== Hereditary transthyretin-mediated amyloidosis =====
A follow-on drug to Inotersen is being developed by Ionis Pharmaceuticals and under license to Akcea Therapeutics for hereditary transthyretin-mediated amyloidosis. In this formulation the ASO is conjugated to N-Acetylgalactosamine enabling hepatocyte-specific delivery, greatly reducing dose requirements and side effect profile while increasing the level of transthyretin reduction in patients.

===== Huntington's disease =====
Tominersen (also known as IONIS-HTT_{Rx} and RG6042) was tested in a phase 3 trial for Huntington's disease although this trial was discontinued on March 21, 2021, due to lack of efficacy. It is currently licensed to Roche by Ionis Pharmaceuticals.

==== Phase I and II trials ====
Clinical trials are ongoing for several diseases and conditions including:

Acromegaly, age related macular degeneration, Alzheimer's disease, amyotrophic lateral sclerosis, autosomal dominant retinitis pigmentosa, beta thalassemia, cardiovascular disease, elevated level of lipoprotein(a), centronuclear myopathy, coagulopathies, Creutzfeldt–Jakob disease, cystic fibrosis, dentatorubral–pallidoluysian atrophy, Duchenne muscular dystrophy, diabetes, epidermolysis bullosa dystrophica, familial chylomicronemia syndrome, frontotemporal dementia, Fuchs' dystrophy, hepatitis B, hereditary angioedema, hypertension, IgA nephropathy, Kjer's optic neuropathy, Leber's hereditary optic neuropathy, multiple system atrophy, non-alcoholic fatty liver disease, Parkinson's disease, prostate cancer, Stargardt disease, STAT3-expressing cancers, Usher syndrome.

=== Preclinical development ===
Several ASOs are currently being investigated in disease models for Alexander disease, ATXN2 (gene) and FUS (gene) amyotrophic lateral sclerosis, Angelman syndrome, Lafora disease, lymphoma, multiple myeloma, myotonic dystrophy, Parkinson's disease, Pelizaeus–Merzbacher disease, and prion disease, Rett syndrome, spinocerebellar Ataxia Type 3.

== See also ==
- Antisense
- Antisense mRNA
- Locked nucleic acid
- Morpholino
- Oligonucleotide synthesis
- Peptide nucleic acid
- RNA interference (which uses double-strand RNA)
