= Gapmer =

DNA structure

Gapmers are short DNA antisense oligonucleotide structures with RNA-like segments on both sides of the sequence. These linear pieces of genetic information are designed to hybridize to a target piece of RNA and silence the gene through the induction of RNase H cleavage. Binding of the gapmer to the target has a higher affinity due to the modified RNA flanking regions, as well as resistance to degradation by nucleases. Gapmers are currently being developed as therapeutics for a variety of cancers, viruses, and other chronic genetic disorders.

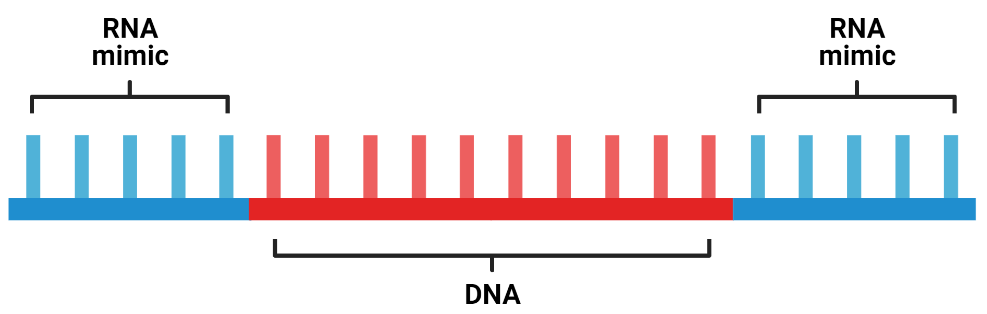
Gapmer Structure

== Chemical structure ==
Gapmers are composed of short DNA strands flanked by strands of RNA mimics. The mimics are typically composed of locked nucleic acids (LNA), 2'-OMe, or 2'-F modified bases. LNA sequences are RNA analogues "locked" into an ideal Watson-Crick base pairing conformation. Gapmers often utilize nucleotides modified with phosphorothioate (PS) groups.

== Mechanism of action ==
The mechanism of therapeutic gene-silencing action relies on degradation through the action of RNase H. Nearly all organisms utilize this family of enzymes to degrade DNA-RNA hybrids as a defense against viral infection. In protein synthesis, DNA is first transcribed into mRNA, and then translated into an amino acid sequence. Gapmers take advantage of this biological pathway by binding to the mRNA target. In humans, the gapmer DNA-mRNA duplex is degraded by RNase H1. The degradation of the mRNA prevents protein synthesis

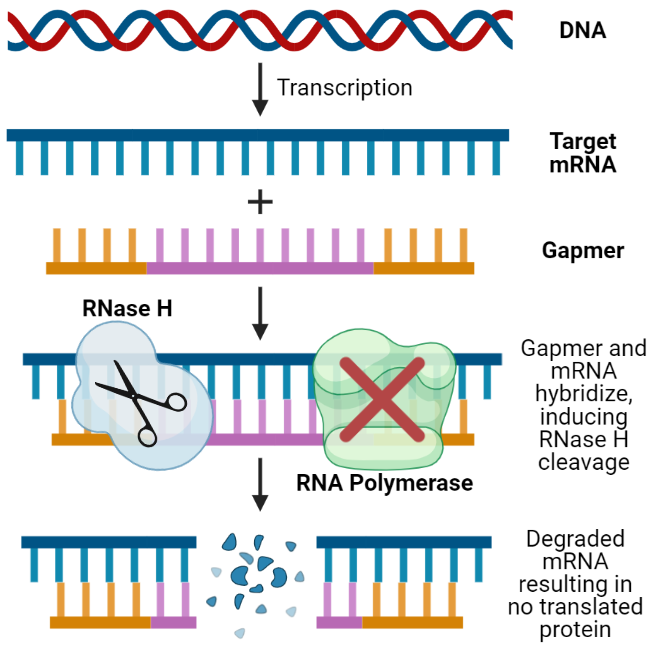
Gapmer Mechanism of Action

== Advantages ==
The gapmer chemical structure is designed to increase resistance to nuclease degradation and enhance stability in vivo. LNAs, 2'-OMe, or 2'-F modified bases are chemical analogs of natural RNA nucleic acids. These modifications allow for an increase in nuclease resistance, reduced immunogenicity, and a decrease in toxicity. Gapmers can also have a high binding affinity to the target mRNA. This high binding affinity reduces off-target effects, non-specific binding, and unwanted gene silencing

== Therapeutics ==
=== Mipomersen (Kynamro) ===
Kynamro was approved by the FDA in January 2013 for the treatment of homozygous familial hypercholesterolemia (HoFH). The drug, developed by Ionis Pharmaceuticals and marketed by Genzyme Corporation, is administered via subcutaneous injection in the form of a mipomersen sodium solution. The chemical structure is composed of a 20-nucleotide (20-mer) chain with phosphorothioate (PS) backbone modifications and 2'-O-Methoxyethyl (MOE) ribose substitutions. Kynamro targets the mRNA product of the APOB gene, which codes for the Apolipoprotein B-100 protein, a component of low-density lipoprotein (LDL). The binding of mipomersen to the APOB mRNA effectively blocks the translation of ApoB-100, and the gapmer-RNA hybrid is then degraded by the RNase H enzyme. Kynamro is reported to have an elimination half-life of approximately 1–2 months

=== Inotersen (Tegsedi) ===
Tegsedi, developed and marketed by Ionis Pharmaceuticals, was approved by the FDA in October 2018 for the treatment of hereditary transthyretin amyloidosis (hATTR). The chemical structure is a 20-mer oligonucleotide with PS backbone modifications and 2'-MOE ribose substitutions. Tegsedi, in the form of an inotersen sodium solution, is administered subcutaneously on a weekly interval. Inotersen binds to the mRNA coding for the transthyretin protein, which blocks translation of the mRNA and recruits RNase enzymes to degrade the gapmer-RNA hybrid. This effectively reduces the level of transthyretin in blood serum, which has been shown to treat polyneuropathy symptoms in patients with hATTR

== Safety ==
Gapmer antisense oligonucleotides (ASOs) have the potential to cause unintended, off-target effects. These off-target effects are produced when the gapmer binds to mRNA with a sufficient degree of complementarity to the target mRNA, blocking or down-regulating the translation of unintended proteins. The functional consequences of gapmer off-target effects can vary widely, depending on the proteins affected and the extent of the down-regulation. Gapmer-based therapeutics also have the potential for side effects. For example, Kynamro has been shown to induce injection site reactions, nausea, headaches, flu-like symptoms, and hepatotoxic reactions. Side effects of Inotersen include thrombocytopenia, glomerulonephritis, injection site reactions, nausea, headache, fatigue, and fever

== See also ==
- Antisense therapy
- Oligonucleotide synthesis
- Antisense
- RNA therapeutics
