= 5-Methylcytidine =

Chemical compound

Names
- IUPAC name 5-Methylcytidine
- Systematic IUPAC name 4-Amino-1-[(2R,3R,4S,5R)-3,4-dihydroxy-5-(hydroxymethyl)oxolan-2-yl]-5-methylpyrimidin-2(1H)-one
- Other names m^{5}C

Identifiers
CAS Number	2140-61-6
3D model (JSmol)	Interactive image
ChemSpider	83877
ECHA InfoCard	100.016.719
PubChem CID	92918
UNII	TL9PB228DC
CompTox Dashboard (EPA)	DTXSID401016977
- InChI: InChI=1S/C10H15N3O5/c1-4-2-13(10(17)12-8(4)11)9-7(16)6(15)5(3-14)18-9/h2,5-7,9,14-16H,3H2,1H3,(H2,11,12,17)/t5-,6-,7-,9-/m1/s1 Key: ZAYHVCMSTBRABG-JXOAFFINSA-N; InChI=1/C10H15N3O5/c1-4-2-13(10(17)12-8(4)11)9-7(16)6(15)5(3-14)18-9/h2,5-7,9,14-16H,3H2,1H3,(H2,11,12,17)/t5-,6-,7-,9-/m1/s1 Key: ZAYHVCMSTBRABG-JXOAFFINBK
- SMILES: O=C1/N=C(/N)\C(=C/N1[C@@H]2O[C@@H]([C@@H](O)[C@H]2O)CO)C

Properties
Chemical formula	C_{10}H_{15}N_{3}O_{5}
Molar mass	257.246 g·mol^{−1}
- Except where otherwise noted, data are given for materials in their standard state (at 25 °C [77 °F], 100 kPa). Infobox references

5-Methylcytidine is a modified nucleoside derived from 5-methylcytosine. It is found in ribonucleic acids of animal, plant, and bacterial origin.
