= Oligonucleotide =

Class of short biopolymers

Oligonucleotides are short DNA or RNA molecules, oligomers, that have a wide range of applications in genetic testing, research, and forensics. Commonly made in the laboratory by solid-phase chemical synthesis, these small fragments of nucleic acids can be manufactured as single-stranded molecules with any user-specified sequence, and so are vital for artificial gene synthesis, polymerase chain reaction (PCR), DNA sequencing, molecular cloning and as molecular probes. In nature, oligonucleotides are usually found as small RNA molecules that function in the regulation of gene expression (e.g. microRNA), or are degradation intermediates derived from the breakdown of larger nucleic acid molecules.

Oligonucleotides are characterized by the sequence of nucleotide residues that make up the entire molecule. The length of the oligonucleotide is usually denoted by "-mer" (from Greek meros, "part"). For example, an oligonucleotide of six nucleotides (nt) is a hexamer, while one of 25 nt would usually be called a "25-mer". Oligonucleotides readily bind, in a sequence-specific manner, to their respective complementary oligonucleotides, DNA, or RNA to form duplexes or, less often, hybrids of a higher order. This basic property serves as a foundation for the use of oligonucleotides as probes for detecting specific sequences of DNA or RNA. Examples of procedures that use oligonucleotides include DNA microarrays, Southern blots, ASO analysis, fluorescent in situ hybridization (FISH), PCR, and the synthesis of artificial genes.

Oligonucleotides are composed of 2'-deoxyribonucleotides (oligodeoxyribonucleotides), which can be modified at the backbone or on the 2' sugar position to achieve different pharmacological effects. These modifications give new properties to the oligonucleotides and make them a key element in antisense therapy.

== Synthesis ==
Oligonucleotides are chemically synthesized using building blocks, protected phosphoramidites of natural or chemically modified nucleosides or, to a lesser extent, of non-nucleosidic compounds. The oligonucleotide chain assembly proceeds in the 3' to 5' direction by following a routine procedure referred to as a "synthetic cycle". Completion of a single synthetic cycle results in the addition of one nucleotide residue to the growing chain. A less than 100% yield of each synthetic step and the occurrence of side reactions set practical limits of the efficiency of the process. In general, oligonucleotide sequences are usually short (13–25 nucleotides long). The maximum length of synthetic oligonucleotides hardly exceeds 200 nucleotide residues. HPLC and other methods can be used to isolate products with the desired sequence.

== Chemical modifications ==
Creating chemically stable short oligonucleotides was the earliest challenge in developing ASO therapies. Naturally occurring oligonucleotides are easily degraded by nucleases, an enzyme that cleaves nucleotides and is ample in every cell type. Short oligonucleotide sequences also have weak intrinsic binding affinities, which contributes to their degradation in vivo.

=== Backbone modifications ===
Nucleoside organothiophosphate (PS) analogs of nucleotides give oligonucleotides some beneficial properties. Key beneficial properties that PS backbones give nucleotides are diastereomer identification of each nucleotide and the ability to easily follow reactions involving the phosphorothioate nucleotides, which is useful in oligonucleotide synthesis. PS backbone modifications to oligonucleotides protects them against unwanted degradation by enzymes. Modifying the nucleotide backbone is widely used because it can be achieved with relative ease and accuracy on most nucleotides. Fluorescent modifications on 5' and 3' end of oligonucleotides was reported to evaluate the oligonucleotides structures, dynamics and interactions with respect to environment.

=== Sugar ring modifications ===
Another modification that is useful for medical applications of oligonucleotides is 2' sugar modifications. Modifying the 2' position sugar increases the effectiveness of oligonucleotides by enhancing the target binding capabilities of oligonucleotides, specifically in antisense oligonucleotides therapies. They also decrease non specific protein binding, increasing the accuracy of targeting specific proteins. Two of the most commonly used modifications are 2'-O-methyl and the 2'-O-methoxyethyl. Fluorescent modifications on the nucleobase was also reported.

== Antisense oligonucleotides ==
Antisense oligonucleotides (ASO) are single strands of DNA or RNA that are complementary to a chosen sequence. In the case of antisense RNA they prevent protein translation of certain messenger RNA strands by binding to them, in a process called hybridization. Antisense oligonucleotides can be used to target a specific, complementary (coding or non-coding) RNA. If binding takes place this hybrid can be degraded by the enzyme RNase H. RNase H is an enzyme that hydrolyzes RNA, and when used in an antisense oligonucleotide application results in 80-95% down-regulation of mRNA expression.

The use of Morpholino antisense oligonucleotides for gene knockdowns in vertebrates, which is now a standard technique in developmental biology and is used to study altered gene expression and gene function, was first developed by Janet Heasman using Xenopus. FDA-approved Morpholino drugs include eteplirsen and golodirsen. The antisense oligonucleotides have also been used to inhibit influenza virus replication in cell lines.

Neurodegenerative diseases that are a result of a single mutant protein are good targets for antisense oligonucleotide therapies because of their ability to target and modify very specific sequences of RNA with high selectivity. Many genetic diseases including Huntington's disease, Alzheimer's disease, Parkinson's disease, and amyotrophic lateral sclerosis (ALS) have been linked to DNA alterations that result in incorrect RNA sequences and result in mistranslated proteins that have a toxic physiological effect.

Investigational ASO approaches have also been reported for rare genetic epilepsies, including KCNT1-associated developmental and epileptic encephalopathy, where knockdown of KCNT1 has been studied in preclinical human neuronal models and in two treated children, and prenatal targeting

== Cell internalisation ==
Cell uptake/internalisation still represents the biggest hurdle towards successful oligonucleotide (ON) therapeutics. A straightforward uptake, like for most small-molecule drugs, is hindered by the polyanionic backbone and the molecular size of ONs. The exact mechanisms of uptake and intracellular trafficking towards the place of action are still largely unclear. Moreover, small differences in ON structure/modification (vide supra) and difference in cell type leads to huge differences in uptake. It is believed that cell uptake occurs on different pathways after adsorption of ONs on the cell surface. Notably, studies show that most tissue culture cells readily take up ASOs (phosphorothiote linkage) in a non-productive way, meaning that no antisense effect is observed. In contrast to that conjugation of ASO with ligands recognised by G-coupled receptors leads to an increased productive uptake. Next to that classification (non-productive vs. productive), cell internalisation mostly proceeds in an energy-dependant way (receptor mediated endocytosis) but energy-independent passive diffusion (gymnosis) may not be ruled out. After passing the cell membrane, ON therapeutics are encapsulated in early endosomes which are transported towards late endosomes which are ultimately fused with lysosomes containing degrading enzymes at low pH. To exert its therapeutic function, the ON needs to escape the endosome prior to its degradation. Currently there is no universal method to overcome the problems of delivery, cell uptake and endosomal escape, but there exist several approaches which are tailored to specific cells and their receptors.

A conjugation of ON therapeutics to an entity responsible for cell recognition/uptake not only increases the uptake (vide supra) but is also believed to decrease the complexity of the cell uptake as mainly one (ideally known) mechanism is then involved. This has been achieved with small molecule-ON conjugates for example bearing an N-acetyl galactosamine which targets receptors of hepatocytes. These conjugates are an excellent example for obtaining an increased cell uptake paired with targeted delivery as the corresponding receptors are overexpressed on the target cells leading to a targeted therapeutic (compare antibody-drug conjugates which exploit overexpressed receptors on cancer cells). Another broadly used and heavily investigated entity for targeted delivery and increased cell uptake of oligonucleotides are antibodies.

== Analytical techniques ==
=== Chromatography ===
Alkylamides can be used as chromatographic stationary phases. Those phases have been investigated for the separation of oligonucleotides. Ion-pair reverse-phase high-performance liquid chromatography is used to separate and analyse the oligonucleotides after automated synthesis.

=== Mass spectrometry ===
A mixture of 5-methoxysalicylic acid and spermine can be used as a matrix for oligonucleotides analysis in MALDI mass spectrometry. ElectroSpray Ionization Mass Spectrometry (ESI-MS) is also a powerful tool to characterize the mass of oligonucleotides.

=== DNA microarray ===
DNA microarrays are a useful analytical application of oligonucleotides. Compared to standard cDNA microarrays, oligonucleotide based microarrays have more controlled specificity over hybridization, and the ability to measure the presence and prevalence of alternatively spliced or polyadenylated sequences. One subtype of DNA microarrays can be described as substrates (nylon, glass, etc.) to which oligonucleotides have been bound at high density. There are a number of applications of DNA microarrays within the life sciences.

== See also ==
- Aptamers, oligonucleotides with important biological applications
- Morpholinos, oligos with non-natural backbones, which do not activate RNase-H but can reduce gene expression or modify RNA splicing
- Polymorphism, the appearance in a population of the same gene in multiple forms because of mutations; can often be tested with ASO probes
- CpG Oligodeoxynucleotide, an ODN with immunostimulatory properties
- Polypurine reverse-Hoogsteen hairpins, PPRHs, oligonucleotides that can bind either DNA or RNA and decrease gene expression.
