= Steve Wilton =

Australian molecular biologist and academic

Stephen Donald Wilton AO FAHMS
- Occupations: Molecular biologist and academic
- Awards: Western Australian Innovator of the Year Award, Western Australia Government (2012); Officer Order of Australia, Department of the Prime Minister and Cabinet (2021); Fellow Australian Academy of Health and Medical Sciences

Academic background
- Education: Bachelor of Science; Bachelor of Science Honours; Doctor of Philosophy
- Alma mater: University of Adelaide
- Thesis: (1984)

Academic work
- Institutions: The Perron Institute for Neurological and Translational Science; The University of Western Australia; Murdoch University; Murdoch's Centre for Molecular Medicine and Innovative Therapeutics

Stephen Donald Wilton AO, also known as Steve Wilton, is an Australian molecular biologist and academic, serving as the Foundation Professor of Molecular Therapy at Murdoch University and adjunct professor at the University of Western Australia (UWA). He also fulfills dual roles as a Director at the Perron Institute for Neurological and Translational Science and deputy director at Murdoch's Centre for Molecular Medicine and Innovative Therapeutics (CMMIT).

Wilton and his colleague Sue Fletcher were among the first to explore the application of antisense oligomers for treating Duchenne muscular dystrophy (DMD). Their research led to the development of three exon-skipping compounds that have received approval from the US FDA for restoring functional dystrophin expression in the most common mutations associated with DMD. His research in molecular therapy and translational medicine, emphasizing neuromuscular diseases like DMD, has earned him awards such as the Western Australian Innovator of the Year Award, the Australian Museum Eureka Award for Translational Medicine, and the LabGear Discovery Award. He was honored as an Officer of the Order of Australia for his contributions to medical research, neurological science, and muscular dystrophy.

Wilton holds the title of Paul Harris Fellow at Rotary International and is an Honorary Life Member of Muscular Dystrophy Western Australia and the Australasian Gene and Cell Therapy Society.

== Education ==
Wilton obtained his Bachelor of Science degree from the University of Adelaide (AU) in 1978, followed by a Bachelor of Science with Honours in 1979. He served as Chief Production Biochemist at Geneworks in Adelaide, from 1983 to 1987 after completing his Doctor of Philosophy degree, which was conferred in 1984 from AU.

== Career ==
Wilton served as the Head of the DNA Sequencing Unit at the Australian Neuromuscular Research Institute from 1991 to 2004. He then directed the High Throughput Genotyping Facility at the Neurodegenerative Diseases Centre from 1999 to 2010 and occupied various roles at UWA until 2013, including Research Professor and Head of the Molecular Genetic Therapies Group. In 2013, he assumed the position of Director at the Perron Institute and concurrently took on an appointment as Foundation Chair in Molecular Therapy at the Centre for Comparative Genomics at Murdoch University. He was also involved in establishing Centre for Molecular Medicine and Innovative Therapeutics (CMMIT) as part of Murdoch's Health Futures initiative as a research joint venture with the Perron Institute in 2019. He served as the Director of CMMIT until early 2023 and holds the position of Deputy Director while serving on its Community Advisory Group and focusing on research on precision medicine and therapeutics for inherited and acquired disorders. Additionally, he holds positions as Foundation Chair and Co-Head of the Molecular Therapy Laboratory at Murdoch University, and is an adjunct professor at UWA. He continues to be the Director at the Perron Institute for Neurological and Translational Science, a position he has held since 2013.

Wilton has worked with various organizations, including Neuromuscular WA, MSWA, Rotary Club (Australia and International), FSHD Global, SMA Australia, and multiple Duchenne-focused groups. He held the position of vice-president at the Australian Gene Therapy Society from 2007 to 2009 and served as President of the Australasian Gene and Cell Therapy Society (AGCTS), while also holding a seat on the executive board of the World Muscle Society from 2010 to 2012. In addition, he co-founded RAGE Biotech and has remained an Ex Officio Committee member at AGCTS since 2013.

== Research ==
Wilton's research spans molecular medicine, antisense nucleic acids, RNA splicing, and precision medicine, with applications for conditions including neurodegenerative diseases, cystic fibrosis, muscular dystrophies, multiple sclerosis, and respiratory conditions. His research group has also developed pre-clinical candidates for adult-onset Pompe's disease, inflammation, and motor neuron disease. In collaboration with Monash University researchers, his group has focused on anti-inflammatory oligomers targeting Receptor for Advanced Glycation Endproducts (RAGE) for conditions such as sepsis, asthma, and emphysema.

Wilton's work has been featured in media outlets including The West Australian, Boston Business Journal, Business News, and ABC News.

=== Molecular therapy and translational medicine ===
Wilton's group was the first to report specific exon skipping in an animal model of Duchenne muscular dystrophy, which led ultimately to the development of a complete panel of splice-switching oligonucleotides. Their work demonstrated the efficacy of phosphorodiamidate morpholino oligomers (PMOs) as splice-switching agents. Their efforts culminated in the development of three drugs: Eteplirsen (Exondys 51), targeting exon 51 and approved in 2016; Golodirsen (Vyondys 53), targeting exon 53 and approved in 2019; and Casimersen (Amondys 45), approved in 2021.

Wilton has demonstrated the broad applicability of splice-switching antisense oligomers in addressing various diseases such as Marfan syndrome and juvenile-onset Parkinson's disease. His earlier research identified rare dystrophin-positive fibers, termed revertant fibers, as a potential genetic therapy for DMD, Additionally, he documented the first successful excision of dystrophin exon 23 in vitro using steric-blocking antisense oligomers and demonstrated that weekly intravenous injections of morpholino antisense oligonucleotides (AONs) induce functional dystrophin expression in mdx mice, suggesting potential for DMD treatment.

In 2006, Wilton developed antisense oligomers to induce exon skipping in the human dystrophin gene, showing varying efficiency across exons. His research in 2009 showed the safe increase of dystrophin expression with intramuscular AVI-4658 administration, advancing DMD clinical trials, while his 2011 work highlighted AVI-4658's well-tolerance, exon 51 skipping induction, and new dystrophin protein expression, indicating its potential as a disease-modifying drug for DMD. Collaborating with R.N. Veedu and Fletcher, he stressed the importance of evaluating reported dystrophin expression and addressing drug safety, efficacy, and study parameters to promote targeted dystrophin exon removal. Furthermore, he explored the potential of PMO in restoring functional expression of the SMN2 gene transcript in spinal muscular atrophy (SMA).

== Awards and honors ==
- 2009 – Paul Harris Fellow, Rotary International
- 2012 – Western Australian Innovator of the Year, Western Australian Department of Commerce
- 2013 – NSW Health Jamie Callachor Eureka Prize for Medical Research Translation, Australia Museum
- 2021 – Officer Order of Australia, Department of the Prime Minister and Cabinet
- 2022 – Industry Leadership Award, AusBiotech and Johnson & Johnson
- 2024 – Fellow of the Australian Academy of Health and Medical Sciences

== Selected articles ==
- Alter, Julia; Lou, Fang; Rabinowitz, Adam; Yin, HaiFang; Rosenfeld, Jeffrey; Wilton, Steve D; Partridge, Terence A; Lu, Qi Long (February 2006). "Systemic delivery of morpholino oligonucleotide restores dystrophin expression bodywide and improves dystrophic pathology". Nature Medicine. 12 (2): 175–177. doi:10.1038/nm1345. PMID 16444267.
- Kinali, Maria; Arechavala-Gomeza, Virginia; Feng, Lucy; Cirak, Sebahattin; Hunt, David; Adkin, Carl; Guglieri, Michela; Ashton, Emma; Abbs, Stephen; Nihoyannopoulos, Petros; Garralda, Maria Elena; Rutherford, Mary; Mcculley, Caroline; Popplewell, Linda; Graham, Ian R; Dickson, George; Wood, Matthew JA; Wells, Dominic J; Wilton, Steve D; Kole, Ryszard; Straub, Volker; Bushby, Kate; Sewry, Caroline; Morgan, Jennifer E; Muntoni, Francesco (October 2009). "Local restoration of dystrophin expression with the morpholino oligomer AVI-4658 in Duchenne muscular dystrophy: a single-blind, placebo-controlled, dose-escalation, proof-of-concept study". The Lancet Neurology. 8 (10): 918–928. doi:10.1016/S1474-4422(09)70211-X. PMC 2755039. PMID 19713152.
- Cirak, Sebahattin; Arechavala-Gomeza, Virginia; Guglieri, Michela; Feng, Lucy; Torelli, Silvia; Anthony, Karen; Abbs, Stephen; Garralda, Maria Elena; Bourke, John; Wells, Dominic J; Dickson, George; Wood, Matthew JA; Wilton, Steve D; Straub, Volker; Kole, Ryszard; Shrewsbury, Stephen B; Sewry, Caroline; Morgan, Jennifer E; Bushby, Kate; Muntoni, Francesco (August 2011). "Exon skipping and dystrophin restoration in patients with Duchenne muscular dystrophy after systemic phosphorodiamidate morpholino oligomer treatment: an open-label, phase 2, dose-escalation study". The Lancet. 378 (9791): 595–605. doi:10.1016/S0140-6736(11)60756-3. PMC 3156980. PMID 21784508.
- Barrett, Lucy W.; Fletcher, Sue; Wilton, Steve D. (November 2012). "Regulation of eukaryotic gene expression by the untranslated gene regions and other non-coding elements". Cellular and Molecular Life Sciences. 69 (21): 3613–3634. doi:10.1007/s00018-012-0990-9. PMC 3474909. PMID 22538991.
- Mejzini, Rita; Flynn, Loren L.; Pitout, Ianthe L.; Fletcher, Sue; Wilton, Steve D.; Akkari, P. Anthony (6 December 2019). "ALS Genetics, Mechanisms, and Therapeutics: Where Are We Now?". Frontiers in Neuroscience. 13 1310. doi:10.3389/fnins.2019.01310. PMC 6909825. PMID 31866818.
