= Toshifumi Yokota =

Japanese biomedical scientist

- 横田俊文
- Born: Morioka, Japan
- Education: University of Tokyo
- Awards: Fellow of the Canadian Academy of Health Sciences; The Friends of Garrett Cumming Research & Muscular Dystrophy Canada Endowed Research Chair; The Henri M. Toupin Chair in Neurological Science
- Scientific career
- Workplaces: National Center of Neurology and Psychiatry; Children's National Medical Center; Imperial College London; University of Alberta

Toshifumi (Toshi) Yokota (Japanese: 横田俊文, romanized: Yokota Toshifumi) is a biomedical scientist and Distinguished Professor of medical genetics at the University of Alberta, holding the titles of the Friends of Garrett Cumming Research & Muscular Dystrophy Canada Endowed Research Chair. Yokota is widely recognized for pioneering work in antisense therapy for muscular dystrophy and other genetic diseases, which led to the development of viltolarsen, an FDA-approved treatment for Duchenne muscular dystrophy (DMD). With over 100 peer-reviewed publications and several patents, Yokota has made significant contributions to the field of precision medicine. Yokota also co-edited three volumes in the Methods in Molecular Biology series by Humana Press, Springer-Nature and is on editorial boards of multiple scientific journals.

In 2023, Yokota was elected as a fellow of the Canadian Academy of Health Sciences, an honor that recognizes outstanding achievements in health sciences. In addition, Yokota is Chief Scientific Officer at OligomicsTx, is a co-founder of the Canadian Neuromuscular Network (CAN-NMD), and contributes as a member of the Medical and Scientific Advisory Committee of Muscular Dystrophy Canada.

== Biography ==
Yokota was born in Morioka, a city in Iwate Prefecture, and raised in multiple cities including Tsu, Mie and Nerima, Tokyo, in Japan. After completing a Ph.D. in Biological Science in 2003, further training was undertaken at Imperial College London, as a Research Fellow of the Japan Society for the Promotion of Science, and as a Research Associate at the Children's National Medical Center before joining the University of Alberta in 2011. Yokota is a tenured professor at the University of Alberta Faculty of Medicine and Dentistry, and the Friends of Garrett Cumming Research & Muscular Dystrophy Canada Endowed Research Chair and the Henri M. Toupin Chair in Neurological Science since 2011. In 2022, Yokota received the Scientific Achievement and Innovation Award from BioAlberta. In 2023, Yokota was elected as a Fellow of the Canadian Academy of Health Sciences.

== Major contributions ==
Yokota's research focuses on precision health and personalized genetic medicine using single strands of artificial DNA/RNA-like molecules called antisense oligonucleotides for neuromuscular diseases. Yokota demonstrated the therapeutic potential of antisense oligonucleotides for exon skipping, which can be designed to frame-disrupting exons and restore the reading frame and function of a mutated gene by modulating pre-mRNA splicing, leading to the improvement of skeletal muscle function accompanied by dystrophin restoration for the first time in a severe animal model of Duchenne muscular dystrophy (DMD). Based on the study, viltolarsen, a phosphorodiamidate morpholino oligomer antisense oligonucleotide, was developed for the treatment of DMD in collaboration with a Japanese pharmaceutical company. Viltolarsen was later approved by the Pharmaceuticals and Medical Devices Agency in Japan and by the FDA in the United States in March and August 2020, respectively, after clinical trials conducted in Japan, Canada, and the United States. Yokota's team further developed a potential treatment for nearly half of DMD patients using multiple antisense oligonucleotides and demonstrated therapeutic effects in a dystrophic mouse model. Supported by the Heart and Stroke Foundation of Canada, the research team developed a cocktail of peptide-conjugated morpholinos (PPMOs) and restored expression of dystrophin in the myocardium and Purkinje fibers in the heart muscle of dystrophic animal models. In 2021, the team developed eSkip-Finder, a machine learning-mediated free online application with a database of antisense oligonucleotides to facilitate the design of antisense oligonucleotides that can be used for exon skipping targeted for various genes and exons.

Supported by the Canadian Institutes of Health Research and Muscular Dystrophy Canada, Yokota's team is also developing antisense oligonucleotide-mediated therapy for facioscapulohumeral muscular dystrophy using lipid nanoparticles in collaboration with Pieter Cullis. In 2020, they identified antisense oligonucleotides called gapmers that knock down the expression of a toxic gene called DUX4 in cell and mouse models for the treatment of facioscapulohumeral muscular dystrophy.

Yokota's research identified ASO targets for skipping multiple dysferlin (DYSF) exons (26-27 and 28-29), which were shown to enhance membrane resealing function in patient cells—a therapeutic approach applicable to 5-8% of dysferlinopathy patients globally.

In 2022, Yokota's team identified gapmers that selectively knocked down most of the mutated mRNA for the treatment of fibrodysplasia ossificans progressiva. With support from CIHR and muscular dystrophy Canada, the team also identified novel peptide-conjugated morpholinos called DG9-PMOs that effectively improved mouse models of DMD and spinal muscular atrophy.

== Honors ==
Yokota is honored as a ScholarGPS Highly Ranked Scholar. Yokota's publication record, impact of work, and quality of scholarly contributions have earned rankings of first in Muscular dystrophy, third in Oligonucleotide, and third in Personalized medicine globally over the last five years, placing in the top 0.01 percent of highly ranked scholars.

- Research Fellow of the Japan Society for the Promotion of Science (2003-2005)
- National Institutes of Health Ruth L. Kirschstein National Research Service Award (2010)
- The Friends of Garrett Cumming Research & Muscular Dystrophy Canada Endowed Research Chair (2011-)
- The Henri M. Toupin Chair in Neurological Science (2011-)
- Canadian Institutes of Health Research China-Canada Joint Health Research Initiative Award (2013)
- Scientific Achievement and Innovation Award, BioAlberta (2022)
- Fellow of the Canadian Academy of Health Sciences (2023)
- Startup TNT Life Sciences Summit Finale Pitch Night Winner (2024)
- University of Alberta Innovation Award (2024)
- University of Alberta Distinguished Professorship (2025)

== Selected publications ==
- Yokota T, Lu QL, Partridge T, Kobayashi M, Nakamura A, Takeda S, Hoffman E. Efficacy of morpholino systemic exon-skipping in Duchenne dystrophy dogs. Ann. Neurol., 2009, 65:667-76.
- Echigoya Y, Lim K, Trieu N, Bao B, Miskew B, Vila MC, Novak JS, Hara Y, Lee J, Touznik A, Mamchaoui K, Aoki Y, Takeda S, Nagaraju K, Mouly V, Maruyama R, Duddy W, Yokota T. Quantitative antisense screening and optimization for exon 51 skipping in Duchenne muscular dystrophy. Mol Ther. 2017, 25(11): 2561-2572.
- Echigoya Y, Nakamura A, Aoki Y, Nagata T, Kuraoka M, Urasawa N, Panesar D, Iversen P, Kole R, Maruyama R, Partridge T, Takeda S, Yokota T. Effects of systemic multi-exon skipping with peptide-conjugated morpholinos in the heart of a dog model of Duchenne muscular dystrophy. Proc. Natl. Acad. Sci. U S A., 2017, 114 (16), 4213-4218.
- Lim K, Echigoya Y, Nagata T, Kuraoka M, Kobayashi M, Aoki Y, Partridge T, Maruyama R, Takeda S, Yokota T. Efficacy of multi-exon skipping treatment in Duchenne muscular dystrophy dog model neonates. Mol. Ther. 2019, 27(1): 76-86.
- Echigoya Y, Lim K, Melo D, Bao B, Trieu N, Mizobe Y, Maruyama R, Mamchaoui K, Tanihata J, Aoki Y, Takeda S, Mouly V, Duddy W, Yokota T. Exons 45-55 skipping using mutation-tailored cocktails of antisense morpholinos in the DMD gene. Mol. Ther. 2019, 27(11): 2005-17.
- Lim K, Maruyama R, Echigoya Y, Nguyen Q, Khawaja H, Chandra S, Jones T, Jones P, Chen Y, Yokota T. Inhibition of DUX4 expression with antisense LNA gapmers as a therapy for facioscapulohumeral muscular dystrophy. Proc. Natl. Acad. Sci. U S A. 2020, 117 (28), 16509-16515.
- Lim K, Bittel A, Maruyama R, Echigoya Y, Nguyen Q, Huang Y, Dzierlega, Zhang A, Chen Y, Yokota T. DUX4 transcript knockdown with antisense 2'-O-methoxyethyl gapmers for the treatment of facioscapulohumeral muscular dystrophy. Mol. Ther. 2021, 29(2): 848-58.
- Chiba S, Lim K, Sheri N, Anwar S, Erkut E, Shah A, Aslesh T, Woo S, Sheikh O, Maruyama R, Takano H, Kunitake K, Duddy W, Okuno Y, Aoki Y, Yokota T. eSkip-Finder: a machine learning-based web application and database to identify the optimal sequences of antisense oligonucleotides for exon skipping. Nucleic Acids Res. 2021, 49(W1):W193-W198.
- Lim K, Woo S, Melo D, Huang Y, Dzierlega K, Shah MNA, Aslesh, Roshmi RR, Echigoya Y, Maruyama R, Moulton HM, Yokota T. Development of DG9 peptide-conjugated single- and multi-exon skipping therapies for the treatment of Duchenne muscular dystrophy. Proc. Natl. Acad. Sci. U S A. 2022, 119 (9) e2112546119.
- Aslesh T, Erkut E, Ren J, Lim KRQ, Woo S, Hatlevig S, Moulton HM, Gosgnach S, Greer J, Maruyama R, Yokota T. DG9 peptide-conjugated morpholino rescues phenotype in SMA model mice by reaching the CNS through a single subcutaneous administration. JCI Insight. 2023, e160516.
- Anwar S, Roshmi RR, Woo S, Haque US, Lee J, Duddy WJ, Bigot A, Maruyama R, Yokota T. Antisense oligonucleotide-mediated exon 27 skipping restores dysferlin function in dysferlinopathy patient-derived muscle cells. Mol Ther Nucleic Acids. 2025, 36(1):102443.
