= ALS Society of Canada =

Canadian voluntary health organization

- Formation: 1977; 49 years ago
- Location: Markham, Ontario
- Region served: Canada
- Services: patient services, awareness, research funding
- Key people: Tammy Moore, CEO
- Affiliations: International Alliance of ALS/MND Associations
- Website: als.ca

The ALS Society of Canada is a Canadian voluntary health organization dedicated to the fight against amyotrophic lateral sclerosis (ALS) and to providing support for those living with ALS.

ALS Canada was founded in 1977 and is a registered not-for-profit organization. The organisation is committed to supporting research towards a cure for ALS, also known as Lou Gehrig's disease, supporting the provincial ALS societies in their provision of quality care for persons living with ALS, and building public awareness of ALS and its impact.

== Research ==
The mission of the ALS Society of Canada is to fund research for a cure for ALS.

Since 2000, ALS Canada has been one of the partners of the Neuromuscular Research Partnership (NRP), which is a collaboration between the Canadian Institutes of Health Research (CIHR), Muscular Dystrophy Canada (MDC) and ALS Canada. The NRP makes grants available for research into the causes, treatments, and ultimately the cure for neuromuscular disorders.

ALS Canada is currently funding a national clinical trial, which aims to confirm the effectiveness of lithium in slowing the progression of ALS in patients in the early stages of the disease. At nearly $1,000,000, the lithium trial is ALS Canada's largest research investment to date. The lithium trial is being conducted by a consortium of ALS clinicians in Canada called the Canadian ALS Clinical Trials and Research Network (CALS). The trial is the first joint effort between CALS and the Northeastern ALS Consortium (NEALS) in the United States.

== Support for provincial ALS societies ==
The ALS Society of Canada works with the provincial ALS Societies, which develop local chapters and support groups and provide direct support to people with ALS, their families and caregivers. The provincial societies also offer information and referrals, and support for those affected by ALS. They manage equipment programs and engage in advocacy for people with ALS, their families, physicians and health-care providers.

=== ALS Society of Ontario ===
The ALS Society of Ontario is a non-profit organization in the Canadian province of Ontario that provides support and assistance to people diagnosed with ALS, their friends and families. It was founded in 1988 by an affiliation of ALS Society of Canada chapters in Toronto, Hamilton, London, Ottawa, and Windsor. The Toronto chapter seceded after a year to form the ALS Society of Toronto and Area; in 2004, it rejoined the Ontario society as a regional organization.

== Public awareness ==
Raising awareness of ALS is a key program of the ALS Society of Canada and its provincial partners.

June is ALS awareness month in Canada. Throughout the provinces, public awareness and fundraising campaigns are carried out, such as golf tournaments and the WALK for ALS, which takes place in more than 78 communities across the nation. Canadians also show their support by planting blue cornflowers, the ALS Canada emblem flower, in their gardens.

In 2008, ALS Canada launched a Public Service Announcement (PSA) campaign to educate the public and increase awareness of ALS in the general population. The campaign consists of two 30- and 60-second television spots, in English and French, called "Head and Shoulders", and a series of three English and French print advertisements, called "No Signal".

== Other initiatives ==
In 2006, ALS Canada launched an initiative called als411 to help children and teens cope with ALS in their family. This was followed in 2008 by the creation of the als411 website, which has separate sub-sites for younger children and teens in both English and French. Each sub-site offers interactive components that provide age-appropriate education about ALS, personal stories, and additional resources for information and coping as well as a social networking link on the teen sites.

== See also ==
- Amyotrophic lateral sclerosis
- ALS Association
