= Susan Fletcher =

Susan Fletcher may refer to:

- Susan Fletcher (American author) (born 1951)
- Susan Fletcher (British author) (born 1979)
- Sue Fletcher, Australian molecular biologist
