= ACRV1 =

Protein-coding gene in the species Homo sapiens

Identifiers
- Aliases: ACRV1, D11S4365, SP-10, SPACA2, acrosomal vesicle protein 1
- External IDs: OMIM: 102525; MGI: 104590; HomoloGene: 1219; GeneCards: ACRV1; OMA:ACRV1 - orthologs

Gene location (Human)
Chr.	Chromosome 11 (human)
Band	11q24.2	Start	125,671,522 bp
Band	11q24.2	End	125,680,874 bp

Gene location (Mouse)
Chr.	Chromosome 9 (mouse)
Band	9 A4|9 20.67 cM	Start	36,604,516 bp
Band	9 A4|9 20.67 cM	End	36,610,139 bp
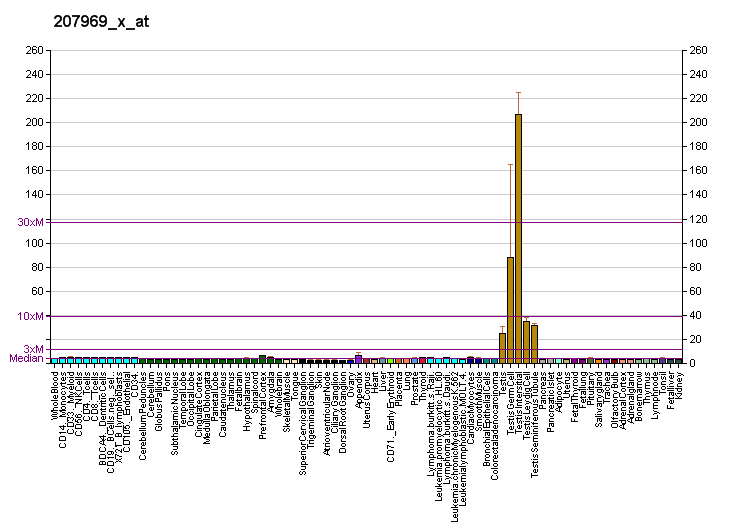

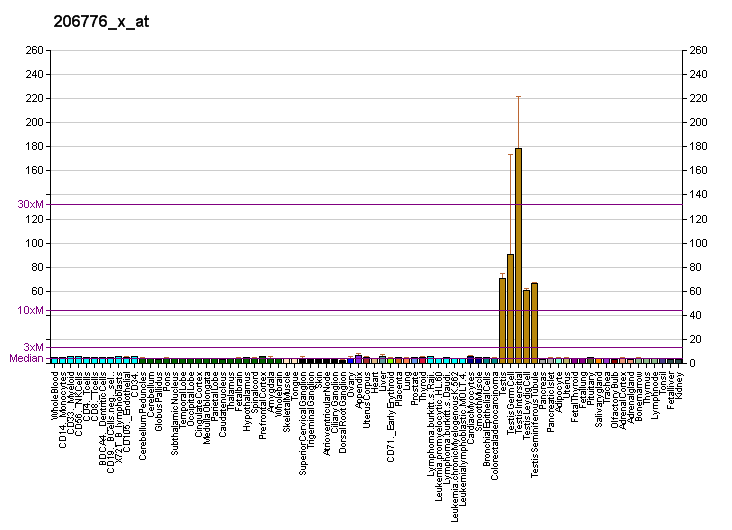

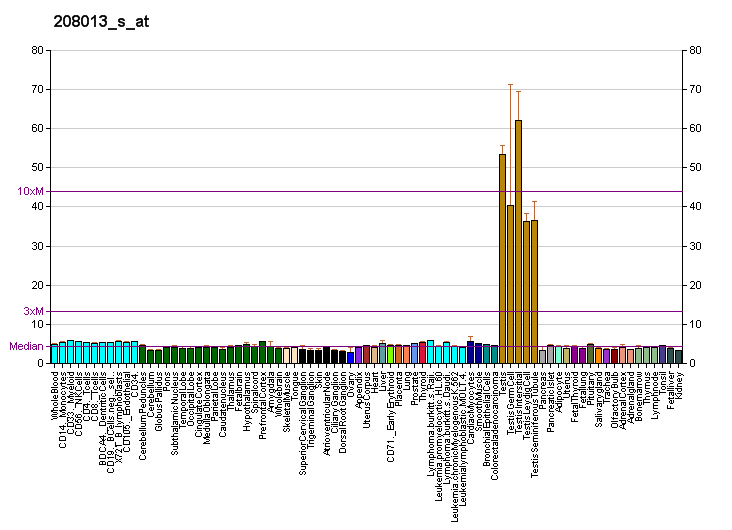
RNA expression pattern
Bgee	Human / Mouse (ortholog); Top expressed in: left testis; right testis; sperm; testicle; gonad; pancreatic ductal cell; mucosa of ileum; tibialis anterior muscle; ventricular zone; prefrontal cortex / Top expressed in: spermatid; seminiferous tubule; spermatocyte; embryo; seminal vesicula; zygote; secondary oocyte; central gray substance of midbrain; medial ganglionic eminence; islet of Langerhans; More reference expression data
BioGPS	More reference expression data
Orthologs
Species	Human	Mouse
Entrez	56	11451
Ensembl	ENSG00000134940	ENSMUSG00000032110
UniProt	P26436	P50289
RefSeq (mRNA)	NM_020115; NM_001612; NM_020069; NM_020107; NM_020108 NM_020109; NM_020110; NM_020111; NM_020112; NM_020113; NM_020114	NM_007391
RefSeq (protein)	NP_001603; NP_064454; NP_064492; NP_064493	NP_031417
Location (UCSC)	Chr 11: 125.67 – 125.68 Mb	Chr 9: 36.6 – 36.61 Mb
PubMed search
- Wikidata
View/Edit Human	View/Edit Mouse

Acrosomal protein SP-10 is a protein that in humans is encoded by the ACRV1 gene.

This gene encodes a testis-specific, differentiation antigen, acrosomal vesicle protein 1, that arises within the acrosomal vesicle during spermatogenesis, and is associated with the acrosomal membranes and matrix of mature sperm. This gene consists of 4 exons and its alternative splicing generates multiple distinct transcripts, which encode protein isoforms ranging from 81 to 265 amino acids. The longest transcript is the most abundant, comprising 53-72% of the total acrosomal vesicle protein 1 messages; the second largest transcript comprises 15-32%; the third and the fourth largest transcripts account for 3.4-8.3% and 8.7-12.5%, respectively; and the remaining transcripts combined account for < 1% of the total acrosomal vesicle protein 1 message. It is suggested that phenomena of cryptic splicing and exon skipping occur within this gene. The acrosomal vesicle protein 1 may be involved in sperm-zona binding or penetration, and it is a potential contraceptive vaccine immunogen for humans.
