= SGT-003 =

Experimental gene therapy

SGT-003 is an experimental gene therapy being tested for Duchenne's muscular dystrophy. It is hoped to be an improvement on Solid Bioscience's earlier gene therapy SGT-001.
