= Cure Rare Disease =

US non-profit biotechnology company

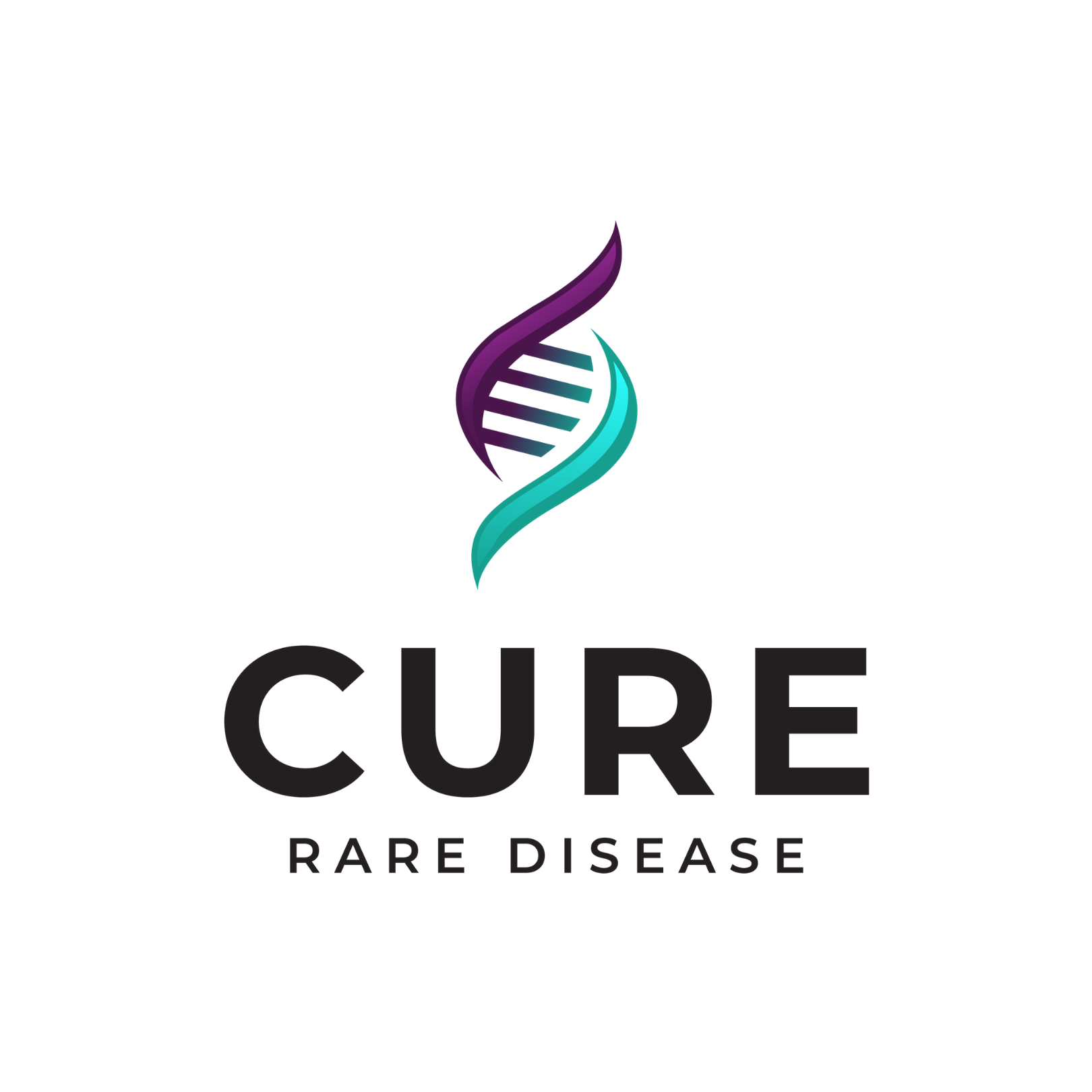
- Abbreviation: CRD
- Formation: 2017
- Founder: Rich Horgan
- Type: non-profit
- Region served: United States
- Website: cureraredisease.org

Cure Rare Disease is a non-profit biotechnology company based in Woodbridge, Connecticut that is working to create novel therapeutics using gene therapy, gene editing (CRISPR technology) and antisense oligonucleotides to treat people impacted by rare and ultra-rare genetic neuromuscular conditions.

== History ==
Richard Horgan founded Terry's Foundation for Muscular Dystrophy in 2017, which became Cure Rare Disease in 2018, in order to develop a cure for Duchenne muscular dystrophy for his brother who has been battling the disease since childhood. Leveraging his network from Harvard Business School, Horgan formed a collaboration consisting of leading researchers and clinicians around the country to develop this cure for his brother, and eventually founded Cure Rare Disease.

Horgan connected first with a scientist at Boston Children's Hospital, Dr. Timothy Yu, who had just successfully created a custom drug for a girl with the neurodegenerative condition, Batten disease using antisense oligonucleotide (ASO) technology. Horgan's brother's mutation is not amenable to ASO technology, so Horgan adopted the process and instead used CRISPR as the technology to attempt to cure his brother.

This collaboration has expanded over the past three years and has led to the addition of notable researchers and institutions collaborating with Cure Rare Disease on their mission to treat rare disease.

== Research ==
There are currently three drugs approved by the FDA for Duchenne muscular dystrophy to treat the patients with mutations on the dystrophin gene encompassing exon 51, 53, and 45. However, people with DMD have mutations impacting different exons of the gene, so these do not work to treat all patients.

Cure Rare Disease is developing novel therapeutics using gene replacement, gene editing (CRISPR gene-editing) and antisense oligonucleotide technologies. To systemically deliver a subset of therapeutics, including CRISPR, the therapeutic is inserted into the adeno-associated virus (AAV). The drug developed for Horgan’s brother used a CRISPR transcriptional activator which functions to upregulate an alternative isoform of dystrophin. Because the CRISPR activation technology does not induce a double stranded cut, rather it acts to upregulate the target of interest, there is less risk of introducing an off-target genetic mutation. Through the collaboration with Cure Rare Disease, researchers at Charles River Laboratories, headquartered in Wilmington, Massachusetts, have develop animal models with the same genetic mutation as the person to be treated with the drug so that therapeutic efficacy and safety can be shown.

After extensive efficacy and safety testing, Cure Rare Disease secured approval of the Investigational New Drug (IND) application from the United States Food and Drug Administration (FDA) to dose Terry with the first-in-human CRISPR transcriptional activator in July 2022.

Finding success in developing a novel framework to treat the first patient, Cure Rare Disease expanded the development of additional therapeutics. Currently, there are 18 mutations and conditions in the Cure Rare Disease pipeline, including Duchenne muscular dystrophy, various subtypes of Limb-girdle muscular dystrophy, spinocerebellar ataxia type 3 (SCA3), and ADSSL1 distal myopathy. As of 2022, none of these conditions have a viable treatment available for the population impacted. To better plan for future therapeutic endeavors, Cure Rare Disease established a patient registry where patients and patient families can input their mutation information.

== Partners ==
- Charles River Lab
- University of Massachusetts Medical School
- Yale School of Medicine
- Hospital for Sick Children (SickKids) Toronto, Canada
- The Ohio State University, Columbus, Ohio
- Leiden University Medical Center, Leiden, Netherlands
- Virginia Commonwealth University, Richmond, Virginia
- Andelyn Biosciences, Columbus, Ohio

The cross-functional collaboration includes researchers and clinicians from across the Northern Hemisphere and is focused on developing therapeutics for rare and ultra-rare diseases for which there are no effective treatments.
