= ATC code M09 =

ATC code M09 Other drugs for disorders of the musculo-skeletal system is a therapeutic subgroup of the Anatomical Therapeutic Chemical Classification System, a system of alphanumeric codes developed by the World Health Organization (WHO) for the classification of drugs and other medical products. Subgroup M09 is part of the anatomical group M Musculo-skeletal system.

Codes for veterinary use (ATCvet codes) can be created by placing the letter Q in front of the human ATC code: for example, QM09. ATCvet codes without corresponding human ATC codes are cited with the leading Q in the following list.
National versions of the ATC classification may include additional codes not present in this list, which follows the WHO version.

== M09A Other drugs for disorders of the musculo-skeletal system ==
=== M09AA Quinine and derivatives ===
M09AA01 Hydroquinine
M09AA72 Quinine, combinations with psycholeptics

=== M09AB Enzymes ===
M09AB01 Chymopapain
M09AB02 Collagenase clostridium histolyticum
M09AB03 Bromelains
M09AB52 Trypsin, combinations

=== M09AX Other drugs for disorders of the musculo-skeletal system ===
M09AX01 Hyaluronic acid
M09AX02 Chondrocytes, autologous
M09AX03 Ataluren
M09AX04 Drisapersen
M09AX05 Aceneuramic acid
M09AX06 Eteplirsen
M09AX07 Nusinersen
M09AX08 Golodirsen
M09AX09 Onasemnogene abeparvovec
M09AX10 Risdiplam
M09AX11 Palovarotene
M09AX12 Viltolarsen
M09AX13 Casimersen
M09AX14 Givinostat
M09AX15 Delandistrogene moxeparvovec
M09AX16 Apitegromab
QM09AX90 Equine stem cells
QM09AX99 Combinations
