= Morphant =

An organism which has been treated with a morpholino antisense oligo to temporarily knock down expression of a targeted gene is called a morphant.

== Background ==
This term was coined by Prof. Steve Ekker to describe the zebrafish with which he was experimenting; by knocking down embryonic gene expression using Morpholinos, Prof. Ekker "phenocopied" known zebrafish mutations, that is, he raised embryos that had the same morphological phenotype as embryonic zebrafish with specific gene mutations. Prof. Ekker's papers and presentations describing morphant phenocopies of mutant phenotypes, in combination with Prof. Janet Heasman's earlier work with Morpholinos in Xenopus embryos, led to rapid adoption of Morpholino technology by the developmental biology community.
