= Physical therapy for Duchenne muscular dystrophy =

- Specialty: Neurology

The goal of physical and occupational therapy in Duchenne muscular dystrophy is to obtain a clear understanding of the individual, of their social circumstances and of their environment in order to develop a treatment plan that will improve their quality of life. Individuals with DMD often experience difficulties in areas of self-care, productivity and leisure. This is related to the effects of the disorder, such as decreased mobility; decreased strength and postural stability; progressive deterioration of upper-limb function; and contractures. Occupational and physical therapists address an individual's limitations using meaningful occupations and by grading the activity, by using different assessments and resources such as splinting, bracing, manual muscle testing (MMT), ROM, postural intervention and equipment prescription.

== Orthoses ==
Splints, also referred to as orthoses, are designed to maintain or improve ROM, prevent deformity, and improve function. Splints help to support and keep limbs stretched, which delays or prevents the onset of contractures that commonly affect the knees, hips, feet, elbows, wrists and fingers. Ankle foot orthoses (AFOs) can be used during sleep or during the day. The purpose of this is to keep the foot from pointing downward and sustain the stretch of the Achilles tendon. Maintaining the length of the tendo-Achilles, also referred to as the gastrocnemius-soleus complex, is extremely important for walking. Knee ankle foot orthoses (KAFOs) are also used for walking or for standing and can be used to prolong ambulation or help delay the onset of lower limb contractures. Orthotic devices have also been suggested to help people that need mechanical support stand upright.

== Standing devices ==
Devices to help a person with duchenne muscular dystrophy stand are a common treatment approach. Orthotic devices are used (as discussed above) and also specific standing devices such as standing frames, standing wheelchairs, and tables that have a tilt function. Standing devices are designed to stabilize a person so that they can bear weight and be standing upright safely, even if they are not able to stand on their own. Studies to determine the benefits of standing devices are few and no high-quality randomized trials have been performed. Proposed benefits of standing as a therapy include improved lengthening of the muscles, improvements in range of motion of hips and lower limbs, the potential for a delay in the start of scoliosis, improvements in bone density, improvements in muscle spasms, improved function of the respiratory system and voice, reduced pressure on the skin, and improved sleep and overall well being.

== Manual muscle testing (MMT) and range of motion (ROM) ==
MMT is used to evaluate muscular strength, whereas goniometry or ROM tests measure movement around a joint. These tests indicate need for intervention such as passive and active ROM, strengthening and splinting. Passive ROM combined with the use of night splints can significantly improve tendo-Achilles contractures.

== Exercise ==
Virtual reality devices can be used in order to motivate the individual to do certain upper extremity exercises. A physical therapist can use this device to enhance attention during the session possibly enhancing performance of the session.

== Seating and positioning ==
Proper seating is essential to prevent spinal curvatures. Severe scoliosis is common in DMD and can interfere with sitting, sleeping, and breathing. A wheelchair that is fitted appropriately accounts for frame size, type of seat, lumbar support and cushioning to avoid pressure ulcers. It should be equipped with other mechanical devices, such as tilt ability, in order to provide comfort and to protect the skin. Power wheelchairs are indicated for most clients who can no longer ambulate, as they do not have enough upper extremity strength to propel a manual wheelchair independently. DMD affects many people in their adolescence, so it is crucial for rehab therapists to be conscious that significant development may occur during this time. Without proper seating and postural support throughout development, deformation may occur. This could then result in dysfunctional positioning. It is important for rehab therapists to re-evaluate the fit of an individual's wheelchair as often as every year during adolescence. Other adaptions to seating and positioning may include head and neck supports, as well as supports for the legs and arms.

== Adaptive equipment and devices ==
There are many alternate mobility options, positioning aids and other equipment that rehab therapists may prescribe. These include walkers or quad-canes, which can be used for individuals who are able ambulate to reduce the risk of falling. In addition, transfer boards, mechanical lifts and specific transferring education are important because fractures have been seen to occur during transfers as a result of osteoporosis. Handheld shower heads and bath benches are indicated to enable individuals to manage their own self-care needs as much as possible. Individuals who are able to bear weight and take a few steps may utilize commode chairs, thus giving them the ability to visit the toilet independently. To complement an individualized wheelchair, an occupational therapist may also consider prescribing a hospital bed, pressure-relieving mattresses and foam wedges for proper positioning to prevent pressure skin ulcers, contractures and deformities. Specialized trays, input devices and software may also be prescribed to facilitate computer use. As DMD progresses other medical equipment may become necessary such as a ventilator or other respiratory aids.

== Social skills development ==
Along with physical difficulties, individuals with DMD may have social issues that an occupational therapist can assist them in overcoming. Group sessions or individualized programs that focus on coping mechanisms for depression are examples of what an occupational therapist can facilitate. Self-esteem building for individuals of all ages is an essential part of ensuring that a high quality of life is achieved. Occupational therapy intervention can play an essential role in supporting the development of social skills through group interactions and other life experiences. An occupational therapist can use a variety of psychosocial frameworks for developing strategies and techniques for individuals to utilize, which will help them work through various psychosocial issues they may be experiencing.

== Sexual health ==
Sexuality is a topic that many people feel uncomfortable discussing and thus may be overlooked by health care professionals. An occupational therapist will educate individuals with DMD on safe and effective ways to experience their sexual life. Such education can include various forms of sex as well as numerous positions that they would be able to perform.

== Employment ==
Gaining and maintaining employment can be difficult for individuals with DMD. An occupational therapist may collaborate with an individual, employer and case manager to ensure that the individual's work environment is as enabling and accessible as possible. By adapting the physical work environment, the social environment and the work requirements and guidelines, an individual can maintain meaningful employment as well as be as an asset to his or her employer. This may not only impact the individual's perceived self-efficacy but also his or her financial well-being.

== Home modifications ==
If it is a priority of the client, maintaining independence is often a main focus of occupational therapy interventions. Within the home, there are numerous obstacles that may prevent a client from being as independent as possible. Home modifications and adaptations are something that an occupational therapist can assist with. Such modifications may include: railings for safe mobility and transfers, lifts, adapted kitchens that are accessible for wheelchairs and bathroom modifications such as raised toilet seats or modified baths. Other examples are adaptive equipment for playing computer and video games, supports for biking and adaptations for fishing rods.

== Leisure ==
A recreational or occupational therapist can support individuals with DMD to find leisure activities in which it is meaningful for them to take part. Accommodations and adaptations can be made to enhance participation.

== Advocacy ==
In order to create a successful therapeutic relationship, it is important to coordinate with family members, friends and other social resources to ensure that a person with DMD has both physical and emotional support. An occupational therapist can act as an advocate for his or her client and can educate those around him or her regarding information about the illness, supports, resources and other concerns. An occupational therapist can also provide his or her client with the tools to learn how to provide his or her own advocacy.
