= Exon skipping =

Form of RNA splicing

In molecular biology, exon skipping is a form of RNA splicing used to cause cells to “skip” over faulty or misaligned sections (exons) of a gene, leading to a truncated but still functional protein despite the genetic mutation.

== Mechanism ==
Exon skipping is used to restore the reading frame within a gene. Genes are the genetic instructions for creating a protein, and are composed of introns and exons. Exons are the sections of DNA that contain the instruction set for generating a protein; they are interspersed with non-coding regions called introns. The introns are later removed before the protein is made, leaving only the coding exon regions.

Splicing naturally occurs in pre-mRNA when introns are being removed to form mature-mRNA that consists solely of exons. Starting in the late 1990s, scientists realized they could take advantage of this naturally occurring cellular splicing to downplay genetic mutations into less harmful ones.

The mechanism behind exon skipping is a mutation specific antisense oligonucleotide (AON). An antisense oligonucleotide is a synthesized short nucleic acid polymer, typically fifty or fewer base pairs in length, that will bind to the mutation site in the pre-messenger RNA to induce exon skipping. The AON binds to the mutated exon, so that when the gene is then translated from the mature mRNA, it is “skipped” over, thus restoring the disrupted reading frame. This allows for the generation of an internally deleted, but largely functional protein.

Some mutations require exon skipping at multiple sites, sometimes adjacent to one another, in order to restore the reading frame. Multiple exon skipping has successfully been carried out using a combination of AONs that target multiple exons.

== As a treatment for Duchenne muscular dystrophy ==
Exon skipping is being heavily researched for the treatment of Duchenne muscular dystrophy (DMD), where the muscular protein dystrophin is prematurely truncated which leads to a non-functioning protein. Successful treatment by way of exon skipping could lead to a mostly functional dystrophin protein, and create a phenotype similar to the less severe Becker muscular dystrophy (BMD).

In the case of Duchenne muscular dystrophy, the protein that becomes compromised is dystrophin. The dystrophin protein has two essential functional domains that flank a central rod domain consisting of repetitive and partially dispensable segments. Dystrophin’s function is to maintain muscle fiber stability during contraction by linking the extra cellular matrix to the cytoskeleton. Mutations that disrupt the open reading frame within dystrophin create prematurely truncated proteins that are unable to perform their job. Such mutations lead to muscle fiber damage, replacement of muscle tissue by fat and fibrotic tissue, and premature death typically occurring in the early twenties of DMD patients. Comparatively, mutations that do not upset the open reading frame, lead to a dystrophin protein that is internally deleted and shorter than normal, but still partially functional. Such mutations are associated with the much milder Becker muscular dystrophy. Mildly affected BMD patients carrying deletions that involve over two thirds of the central rod domain have been described, suggesting that this domain is largely dispensable.

Dystrophin can maintain a large degree of functionality so long as the essential terminal domains are unaffected, and exon skipping only occurs within the central rod domain. Given these parameters, exon skipping can be used to restore an open reading frame by inducing a deletion of one or several exons within the central rod domain, and thus converting a DMD phenotype into a BMD phenotype.

The genetic mutation that leads to Becker muscular dystrophy is an in-frame deletion. This means that, out of the 79 exons that code for dystrophin, one or several in the middle may be removed, without affecting the exons that follow the deletion. This allows for a shorter-than-normal dystrophin protein that maintains a degree of functionality. In Duchenne muscular dystrophy, the genetic mutation is out-of-frame. Out-of-frame mutations cause a premature stop in protein generation - the ribosome is unable to “read” the RNA past the point of initial error - leading to a severely shortened and completely non-functional dystrophin protein.

The goal of exon skipping is to manipulate the splicing pattern so that an out-of-frame mutation becomes an in-frame mutation, thus changing a severe DMD mutation into a less harmful in-frame BMD mutation.

One exon-skipping drug was approved in 2016, by the US FDA: eteplirsen (ExonDys51), a Morpholino oligo from Sarepta Therapeutics targeting exon 51 of human dystrophin. Another exon-skipping Morpholino, golodirsen (Vyondys 53) (targeting dystrophin exon 53), was approved in the United States in December 2019. A third antisense oligonucleotide, viltolarsen (Viltepso), targeting dystrophin exon 53 was approved for medical use in the United States in August 2020.

exon skipping drugs approved for DMD
drug	exon	company	UD FDA approval
eteplirsen	51	Sarepta	September 2016
golodirsen	53	Sarepta	December 2019
viltolarsen	53	NS Pharma	August 2020
casimerson	45	Sarepta	March 2021

Genetic testing, usually from blood samples, can be used to determine the precise nature and location of the DMD mutation in the dystrophin gene. It is known that these mutations cluster in areas known as the 'hot spot' regions — primarily in exons 45–53 and to a lesser extent exons 2–20. As the majority of DMD mutations occur in these 'hot spot' regions, a treatment which causes these exons to be skipped could be used to treat up to 50% of DMD patients.

== See also ==
- Antisense therapy
- Poison exon
