= Morpholino nucleic acid =

Chemical compound

Segment of a Morpholino-RNA heteroduplex, 8-mer shown

A Morpholino, also known as a phosphorodiamidate Morpholino oligomer (PMO), is a nucleic acid analog whose backbone consists of methylenemorpholine rings linked through phosphorodiamidate groups, in contrast to the sugars linked through phosphates found in natural nucleic acids. Synthetic oligomers of Morpholinos are used in molecular biology to modify gene expression. Morpholinos block access of other molecules to small (~25 base) specific sequences of the base-pairing surfaces of ribonucleic acid (RNA). Morpholinos are used as research tools for reverse genetics by knocking down gene function.

Morpholinos are in development as pharmaceutical therapeutics targeted against pathogenic organisms such as bacteria or viruses and genetic diseases. A Morpholino-based drug eteplirsen from Sarepta Therapeutics received accelerated approval from the US Food and Drug Administration in September 2016 for the treatment of some mutations causing Duchenne muscular dystrophy, although the approval process was mired in controversy. Other Morpholino-based drugs golodirsen, viltolarsen, and casimersen (also for Duchenne muscular dystrophy) were approved by the FDA in 2019–2021.

"Morpholino" is often capitalized to distinguish the nucleic acid type from other chemicals containing a six-membered morpholine ring, but this usage is not consistent across scientific literature. Vivo-Morpholinos and PPMO are modified forms of Morpholinos with chemical groups covalently attached to facilitate entry into cells.

== History ==
Morpholino oligos were conceived by Summerton (Gene Tools) at AntiVirals Inc. (now Sarepta Therapeutics) and originally developed in collaboration with Weller.

== Structure ==
Morpholinos are synthetic molecules that are the product of a redesign of natural nucleic acid structure. Usually 25 bases in length, they bind to complementary sequences of RNA or single-stranded DNA by standard nucleic acid base-pairing. In terms of structure, the difference between Morpholinos and DNA is that, while Morpholinos have standard nucleic acid bases, those bases are bound to methylenemorpholine rings linked through phosphorodiamidate groups instead of phosphates. The figure compares the structures of the two strands depicted there, one of RNA and the other of a Morpholino. Replacement of anionic phosphates with the uncharged phosphorodiamidate groups eliminates ionization in the usual physiological pH range, so Morpholinos in organisms or cells are uncharged molecules. The entire backbone of a Morpholino is made from these modified subunits.

== Function ==
Morpholinos do not trigger the degradation of their target RNA molecules, unlike many antisense structural types (e.g., phosphorothioates, siRNA). Instead, Morpholinos act by "steric blocking", binding to a target sequence within an RNA, inhibiting molecules that might otherwise interact with the RNA. Morpholino oligos are often used to investigate the role of a specific mRNA transcript in an embryo. Developmental biologists inject Morpholino oligos into eggs or embryos of zebrafish, African clawed frog (Xenopus), sea urchin and killifish (F. heteroclitus) producing morphant embryos, or electroporate Morpholinos into chick embryos at later development stages. With appropriate cytosolic delivery systems, Morpholinos are effective in cell culture. Vivo-Morpholinos, in which the oligo is covalently linked to a delivery dendrimer, enter cells when administered systemically in adult animals or in tissue cultures.

Gene knockdown is achieved by reducing the expression of a particular gene in a cell. In the case of protein-coding genes, this usually leads to a reduction in the quantity of the corresponding protein in the cell. Knocking down gene expression is a method for learning about the function of a particular protein; in a similar manner, causing a specific exon to be spliced out of the RNA transcript encoding a protein can help to determine the function of the protein moiety encoded by that exon or can sometimes knock down the protein activity altogether. These molecules have been applied to studies in several model organisms, including mice, zebrafish, frogs and sea urchins. Morpholinos can also modify the splicing of pre-mRNA or inhibit the maturation and activity of miRNA. Techniques for targeting Morpholinos to RNAs and delivering Morpholinos into cells have recently been reviewed in a journal article and in book form.

=== Normal gene expression in eukaryotes ===
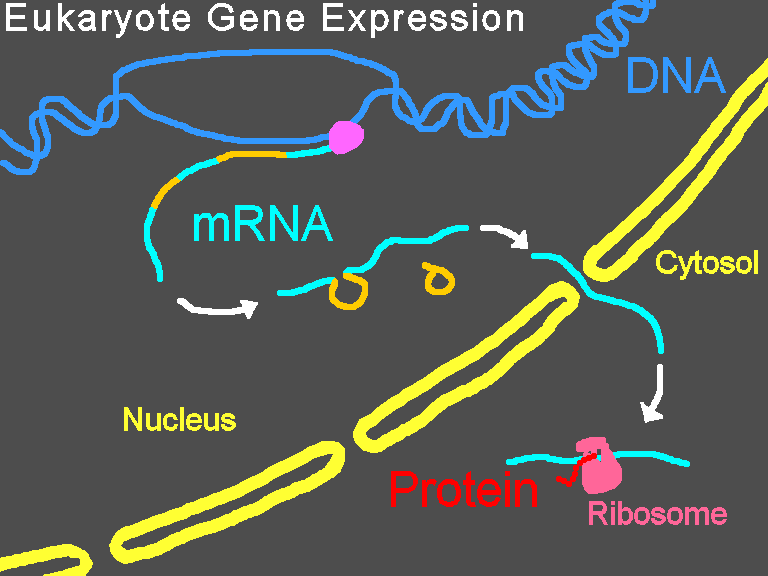
Eukaryotic gene expression without intervention by a Morpholino

In eukaryotic organisms, pre-mRNA is transcribed in the nucleus, introns are spliced out, then the mature mRNA is exported from the nucleus to the cytoplasm. The small subunit of the ribosome usually starts by binding at the 5' end of the mRNA and is joined there by various other eukaryotic initiation factors, forming the initiation complex. The initiation complex scans along the mRNA strand until it reaches a start codon, and then the large subunit of the ribosome attaches to the small subunit and translation of a protein begins. This entire process is referred to as gene expression; it is the process by which the information in a gene, encoded as a sequence of bases in DNA, is converted into the structure of a protein. A Morpholino can modify splicing, block translation, or block other functional sites on RNA depending on the Morpholino's base sequence.

=== Blocking translation ===
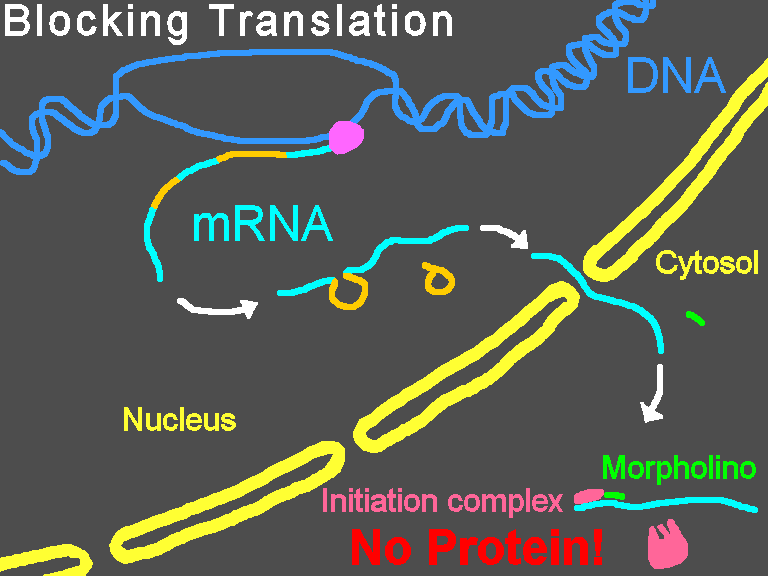
Translation blocked by a Morpholino oligo

Bound to the 5'-untranslated region of messenger RNA (mRNA), Morpholinos can interfere with progression of the ribosomal initiation complex from the 5' cap to the start codon. This prevents translation of the coding region of the targeted transcript (called "knocking down" gene expression). This is useful experimentally when an investigator wishes to know the function of a particular protein; Morpholinos provide a convenient means of knocking down expression of the protein and learning how that knockdown changes the cells or organism. Some Morpholinos knock down expression so effectively that, after degradation of preexisting proteins, the targeted proteins become undetectable by Western blot.

In 2016 a synthetic peptide-conjugated PMO (PPMO) was found to inhibit the expression of New Delhi Metallo-beta-lactamase, an enzyme that many drug-resistant bacteria use to destroy carbapenems.

=== Modifying pre-mRNA splicing ===
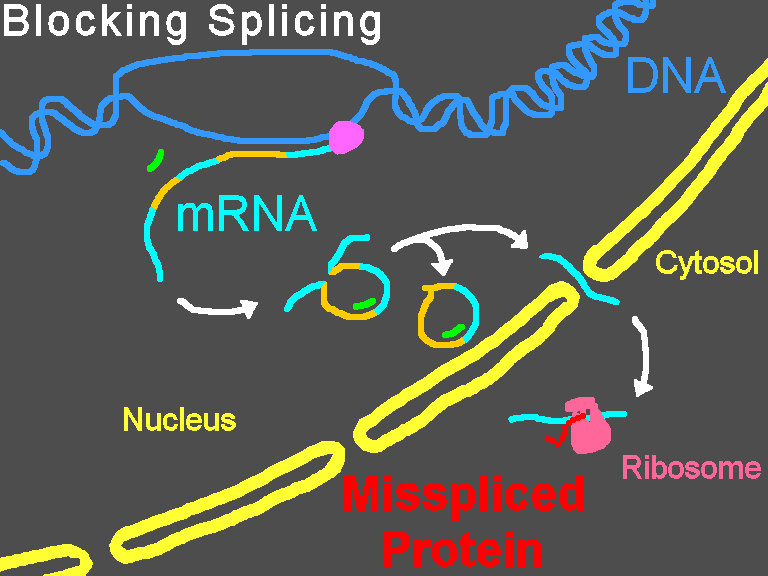
Splicing blocked by a Morpholino oligo

Morpholinos can interfere with pre-mRNA processing steps either by preventing splice-directing small nuclear ribonucleoproteins (snRNP) complexes from binding to their targets at the borders of introns on a strand of pre-mRNA, or by blocking the nucleophilic adenine base and preventing it from forming the splice lariat structure, or by interfering with the binding of splice regulatory proteins such as splice silencers and splice enhancers. Preventing the binding of snRNP U1 (at the donor site) or U2/U5 (at the polypyrimidine moiety and acceptor site) can cause modified splicing, commonly excluding exons from the mature mRNA. Targeting some splice targets results in intron inclusions, while activation of cryptic splice sites can lead to partial inclusions or exclusions. Targets of U11/U12 snRNPs can also be blocked. Splice modification can be conveniently assayed by reverse-transcriptase polymerase chain reaction (RT-PCR) and is seen as a band shift after gel electrophoresis of RT-PCR products.

=== Other applications: blocking other mRNA sites and use as probes ===
Morpholinos have been used to block miRNA activity and maturation. Fluorescein-tagged Morpholinos combined with fluorescein-specific antibodies can be used as probes for in-situ hybridization to miRNAs. Morpholinos can block ribozyme activity. U2 and U12 snRNP functions have been inhibited by Morpholinos. Morpholinos targeted to "slippery" mRNA sequences within protein coding regions can induce translational frameshifts. Morpholinos can block RNA editing, poly(A) tailing and translocation sequences. Morpholino activities against this variety of targets suggest that Morpholinos can be used as a general-purpose tool for blocking interactions of proteins or nucleic acids with mRNA.

== Specificity, stability and non-antisense effects ==
Morpholinos have become a standard knockdown tool in animal embryonic systems, which have a broader range of gene expression than adult cells and can be strongly affected by an off-target interaction. Following initial injections into frog or fish embryos at the single-cell or few-cell stages, Morpholino effects can be measured up to five days later, after most of the processes of organogenesis and differentiation are past, with observed phenotypes consistent with target-gene knockdown. Control oligos with irrelevant sequences usually produce no change in embryonic phenotype, evidence of the Morpholino oligo's sequence-specificity and lack of non-antisense effects. The dose required for a knockdown can be reduced by coinjection of several Morpholino oligos targeting the same mRNA, which is an effective strategy for reducing or eliminating dose-dependent off-target RNA interactions.

mRNA rescue experiments can sometimes restore the wild-type phenotype to the embryos and provide evidence for the specificity of a Morpholino. In an mRNA rescue, a Morpholino is co-injected with an mRNA that codes for the morphlino's protein. However, the rescue mRNA has a modified 5'-UTR (untranslated region) so that the rescue mRNA contains no target for the Morpholino. The rescue mRNA's coding region encodes the protein of interest. Translation of the rescue mRNA replaces production of the protein that was knocked down by the Morpholino. Since the rescue mRNA would not affect phenotypic changes due to the Morpholino's off-target gene expression modulation, this return to wild-type phenotype is further evidence of Morpholino specificity. In some cases, ectopic expression of the rescue RNA makes recovery of the wild-type phenotype impossible.

In embryos, Morpholinos can be tested in null mutants to check for unexpected RNA interactions, then used in a wild-type embryo to reveal the acute knockdown phenotype. The knockdown phenotype is often more extreme than the mutant phenotype; in the mutant, effects of losing the null gene can be concealed by genetic compensation.

Because of their completely unnatural backbones, Morpholinos are not recognized by cellular proteins. Nucleases do not degrade Morpholinos, nor are they degraded in serum or in cells.

Up to 18% of Morpholinos appear to induce nontarget-related phenotypes including cell death in the central nervous system and somite tissues of zebrafish embryos. Most of these effects are due to activation of p53-mediated apoptosis and can be suppressed by co-injection of an anti-p53 Morpholino along with the experimental Morpholino. Moreover, the p53-mediated apoptotic effect of a Morpholino knockdown has been phenocopied using another antisense structural type, showing the p53-mediated apoptosis to be a consequence of the loss of the targeted protein and not a consequence of the knockdown oligo type. It appears that these effects are sequence-specific; as in most cases, if a Morpholino is associated with non-target effects, the 4-base mismatch Morpholino will not trigger these effects.

A cause for concern in the use of Morpholinos is the potential for "off-target" effects. Whether an observed morphant phenotype is due to the intended knockdown or an interaction with an off-target RNA can often be addressed in embryos by running another experiment to confirm that the observed morphant phenotype results from the knockdown of the expected target. This can be done by recapitulating the morphant phenotype with a second, non-overlapping Morpholino targeting the same mRNA, by confirmation of the observed phenotypes by comparing with a mutant strain (though compensation will obscure a phenotype in some mutants), by testing the Morpholino in a null mutant background to detect additional phenotypic changes or by dominant-negative methods. As mentioned above, rescue of observed phenotypes by coinjecting a rescue mRNA is, when feasible, a reliable test of specificity of a Morpholino.

== Delivery ==
For a Morpholino to be effective, it must be delivered past the cell membrane into the cytosol of a cell. Once in the cytosol, Morpholinos freely diffuse between the cytosol and nucleus, as demonstrated by the nuclear splice-modifying activity of Morpholinos observed after microinjection into the cytosol of cells. Different methods are used for delivery into embryos, into cultured cells or into adult animals. A microinjection apparatus is usually used for delivery into an embryo, with injections most commonly performed at the single-cell or few-cell stage; an alternative method for embryonic delivery is electroporation, which can deliver oligos into tissues of later embryonic stages. Common techniques for delivery into cultured cells include the Endo-Porter peptide (which causes the Morpholino to be released from endosomes), the Special Delivery system (no longer commercially available, used a Morpholino-DNA heteroduplex and an ethoxylated polyethylenimine delivery reagent), electroporation, or scrape loading.

Delivery into adult tissues is usually difficult, though there are a few systems allowing useful uptake of unmodified Morpholino oligos (including uptake into muscle cells with Duchenne muscular dystrophy or the vascular endothelial cells stressed during balloon angioplasty). Though they permeate through intercellular spaces in tissues effectively, unconjugated PMOs have limited distribution into the cytosol and nuclear spaces within healthy tissues following IV administration. Systemic delivery into many cells in adult organisms can be accomplished by using covalent conjugates of Morpholino oligos with cell-penetrating peptides, and, while toxicity has been associated with moderate doses of the peptide conjugates, they have been used in vivo for effective oligo delivery at doses below those causing observed toxicity. An octa-guanidinium dendrimer attached to the end of a Morpholino can deliver the modified oligo (called a Vivo-Morpholino) from the blood to the cytosol. Delivery-enabled Morpholinos, such as peptide conjugates and Vivo-Morpholinos, show promise as therapeutics for viral and genetic diseases.

== See also ==
- Oligonucleotide synthesis
- Nucleic acid analogue
- Aptamer
