= Sue Fletcher =

Australian scientist

Professor Sue Fletcher AO FAHMS

Personal details
- Occupation: Molecular and cell biologist

Sue Fletcher is an Australian scientist who is a professor and lecturer at the University of Western Australia and a Senior Principal Research Fellow at Murdoch University. She studies the field of molecular and cell biology and holds the position of chief scientific officer at PYC therapeutics. Currently her research is focused on inherited retinal disease, the central nervous system and neurodegeneration. Alongside Professor Steve Winton she developed novel treatments for Duchenne muscular dystrophy, including eteplirsen, which was the first of its kind to be approved by the FDA in 2016. In 2021 she was appointed an Officer of the Order of Australia for "distinguished service to medical research, to neurological science, and to the treatment and support of those with Muscular Dystrophy".

== Career and research ==
Fletcher completed an undergraduate degree at the University of Zimbabwe. She then moved to Perth, where she completed a PhD at the University of Western Australia, with her thesis titled "The expression of alpha₂-macroglobulin, alpha₁-acid glycoprotein and thiostatin in the developing rat : in vivo and in vitro studies".

Between 1991 and 2013 she work as a Principal Research Fellow under the Centre for Neuromuscular and Neurological Disorders. From 2013 onwards she has worked for Murdoch University. Between 2015 and 2019 she was appointed the deputy director of the Centre for Comparative Genomics.

== Awards and honours ==
- Western Australian Innovator of the Year Award, 2012
- Paul Harris Fellow, Rotary International, 2013
- Eureka Prize for Medical Research Translation, Australia Museum, 2013 (jointly with Professor Wilton)
- Officer of the Order of Australia, 2021
- Fellow of the Australian Academy of Health and Medical Sciences, 2022
