= Muscular Dystrophy Canada =

Canadian non-profit organization

Muscular Dystrophy Canada (MDC) (French: Dystrophie musculaire Canada) is a non-profit organization seeking a cure for neuromuscular disorders. Founded in 1954 as Muscular Dystrophy Association of Canada, volunteers and staff nationwide have helped to provide support and resources to those affected. Since the founding year, over $64 million has been put towards research via collaborations, fundraising events, and donations.

Muscular Dystrophy Canada provides various programs within five areas of service: Education, Information, Advocacy, Support and Equipment.

In 2000, Muscular Dystrophy Canada joined with the ALS Society of Canada and the Canadian Institutes of Health Research in the Neuromuscular Research Partnership (NRP).

In 2011, there were over 38 chapters and two affiliates across Canada.

== History ==
Muscular Dystrophy Canada was founded in 1954 as the Muscular Dystrophy Association of Canada by Dr. David Green and Arthur Minden along with a number of parents whose children were affected by the disorder. The first President was Arthur Minden. Today Arthur Minden's humanitarian work is remembered by the Arthur Minden Pre-Doctoral Award, set up through Muscular Dystrophy Canada. Fire departments have continued to be Muscular Dystrophy Canada's strongest source of fund-raising support.

== Fundraising ==
Muscular Dystrophy Canada hosts many events and initiatives to raise funds. The funds raised help provide research and services for people with neuromuscular disorders. Muscular Dystrophy Canada events also raise awareness about these disorders and get entire communities involved. Some of these fundraising efforts are:

- Walk for Muscular Dystrophy: Muscular Dystrophy Canada's signature event; over 55 events are held across Canada annually.
- Fire Fighter Events: Fire Fighters give their time to organize Rooftop Campouts, boot drives, ladder sits, pancake breakfasts, raffles and more.
- Wheelchair Dare: Participants spend the whole day in a wheelchair and experience what it is like to have limited mobility to raise funds and awareness.
- Buck 4 Luck: Participating retail locations sell lucky shamrocks for one dollar.
- Hop for Muscular Dystrophy: this event raises funds, while educating preschool and elementary school children about neuromuscular disorders in a fun atmosphere of hopping and dancing. It is also an opportunity to promote compassionate, inclusive school communities, where people of all physical abilities are accepted for who they are.
