= Joseph G. Gleeson =

American physician-scientist, professor of neurosciences and genetics

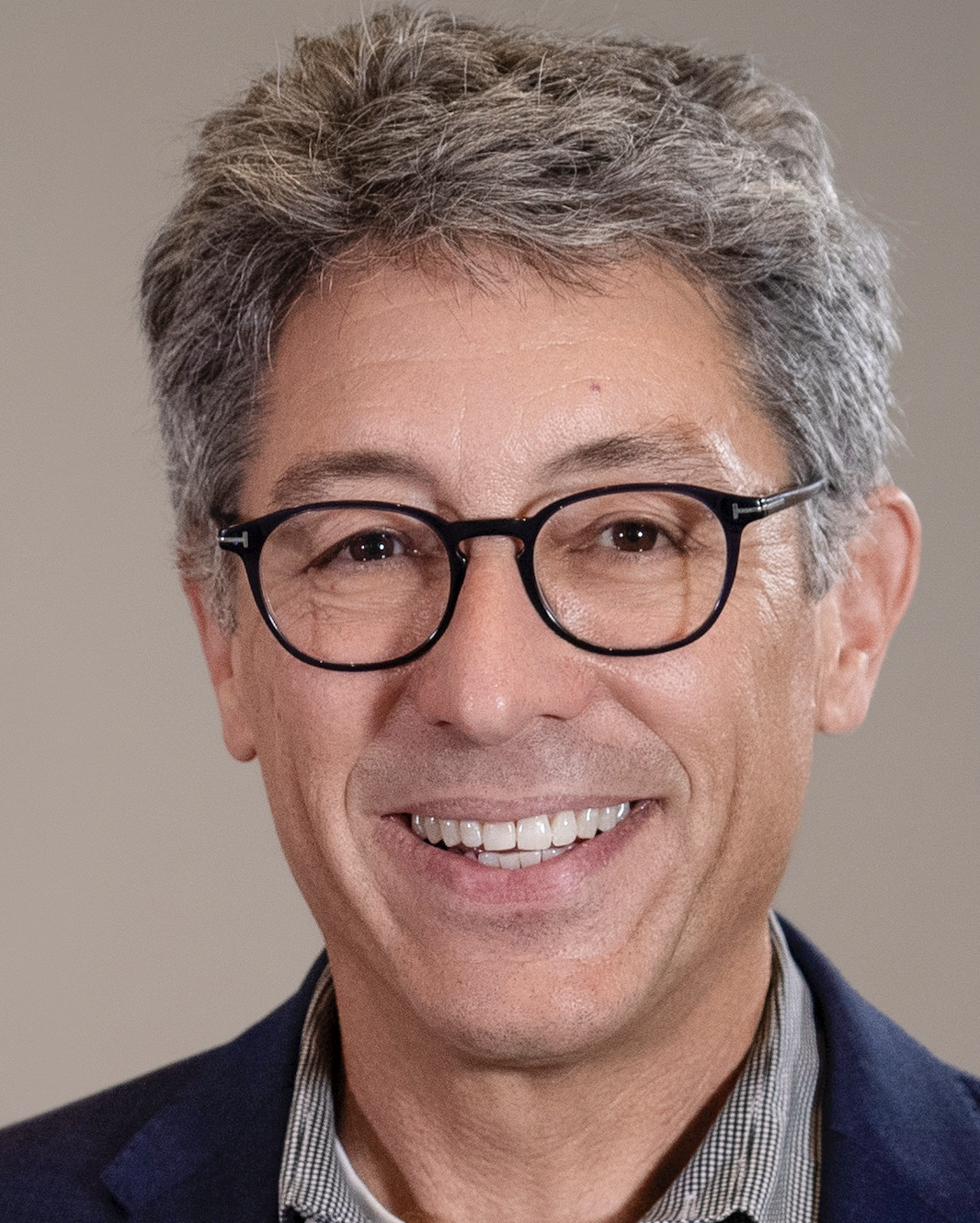
- Education: University of California, San Diego, University of Chicago, Harvard University
- Known for: Research on neurodevelopmental disorders, mosaic mutations, genetic causes of epilepsy
- Scientific career
- Fields: Neurology, Genetics, Neurodevelopment
- Workplaces: University of California, San Diego

Joseph Gleeson is an American physician-scientist and professor of neurosciences and genetics at University of California, San Diego (UCSD). He is known for his research on the genetic and molecular mechanisms underlying neurodevelopmental disorders, including structural birth defects, epileptic encephalopathies, and spina bifida.

== Early life and education ==
Gleeson earned his M.D. from Pritzker School of Medicine at the University of Chicago in 1991, and completed his residency in pediatrics and neurology and fellowship in neurogenetics at Boston Children's Hospital and Harvard Medical School. There, in the laboratory of Christopher A. Walsh, he identified the doublecortin gene as the cause for X-linked lissencephaly and double cortex syndrome, a form of pachygyria, later showing that the gene encodes a Microtubule-associated protein.

== Career ==
Gleeson joined the faculty at the University of California, San Diego in 1999, later moving to a position within Howard Hughes Medical Institute and Rockefeller University, but eventually returning to UCSD, where he serves as the Rady Distinguished Professor of Neurosciences and Pediatrics, as Director of Neurosciences at Rady Children's Hospital Institute for Genomic Medicine, and as Chief Medical Officer of the n-Lorem Foundation. His laboratory focuses on understanding the genetic basis of brain development and neurological disorders, and developing novel therapies.

His publications primarily focus on causes of pediatric neurodevelopmental conditions such as autism, epilepsy, and birth defects, where he has contributed to the discovery of disease-causing mutations in various genes.

His research integrates clinical studies with genomic technologies such as whole-genome sequencing and mosaic variant barcode analysis.

== Research ==
Gleeson's research addresses:

- Mosaic genetic mutations and their role in structural birth defects
- The use of antisense oligonucleotide therapies in treating neurodevelopmental encephalopathy
- Multi-omics approaches in patient-derived neurons for therapeutic discovery

== Selected publications ==
- Ha, Y. J.; Gleeson, J. G.; et al. (2025). "The contribution of de novo coding mutations to meningomyelocele". Nature. 641 (8062): 419–426. Bibcode:2025Natur.641..419H. doi:10.1038/s41586-025-08676-x. PMC 12625549. PMID 40140573.
- Vong, K. I.; Gleeson, J. G.; et al. (2024). "Risk of meningomyelocele mediated by the common 22q11.2 deletion". Science. 384 (6695): 584–590. doi:10.1126/science.adl1624. PMC 11849314. PMID 38696583.
- Chung, C.; Gleeson, J. G.; et al. (2024). "Cell-type-resolved mosaicism reveals clonal dynamics of the human forebrain". Nature. 629 (8011): 384–392. Bibcode:2024Natur.629..384C. doi:10.1038/s41586-024-07292-5. PMC 11194162. PMID 38600385.
- Chung, C.; Gleeson, J. G.; et al. (2023). "Comprehensive multi-omic profiling of somatic mutations in malformations of cortical development". Nature Genetics. 55 (2): 209–220. doi:10.1038/s41588-022-01276-9. PMC 9961399. PMID 36635388.
- Breuss, M. W.; Yang, X.; Gleeson, J. G.; et al. (2022). "Somatic mosaicism reveals clonal distributions of neocortical development". Nature. 604 (7907): 689–696. Bibcode:2022Natur.604..689B. doi:10.1038/s41586-022-04602-7. PMC 9436791. PMID 35444276.
- Chai, G.; Gleeson, J. G.; et al. (2021). "A human pleiotropic multiorgan condition caused by deficient Wnt secretion". The New England Journal of Medicine. 385 (14): 1292–1301. doi:10.1056/NEJMoa2033911. PMC 9017221. PMID 34587386.
- Yang, X.; Breuss, M. W.; Gleeson, J. G.; et al. (2021). "Developmental and temporal characteristics of clonal sperm mosaicism". Cell. 184 (18): 4772–4783.e15. doi:10.1016/j.cell.2021.07.024. PMC 8496133. PMID 34388390.
- Schaffer, A. E.; Breuss, M. W.; Gleeson, J. G.; et al. (2018). "Biallelic loss of human CTNNA2, encoding αN-catenin, leads to ARP2/3 complex overactivity and disordered cortical neuronal migration". Nature Genetics. 50 (8): 1093–1101. doi:10.1038/s41588-018-0166-0. PMC 6072555. PMID 30013181.

== Awards and honors ==
Gleeson has been recognized for his work through several awards and honors, which include:

- Constance Lieber Prize for Innovation in Developmental Neuroscience
- John Merck Program in the Developmental Disabilities in Childhood
- Klingenstein Award in the Neurosciences
- Ray Thomas Edwards Foundation Award
- HHMI Investigator
- Searle Scholar
- Member of the National Academy of Medicine
- Sachs Scientific Achievement Award

== See also ==
- Neurogenetics
- Encephalopathy
- Mosaic (genetics)
