= Yvonne Greenstreet =

British biotechnology executive

- Born: London
- Education: University of Leeds; INSEAD
- Occupations: Business executive Medical doctor
- Organization: Alnylam Pharmaceuticals
- Known for: Powerlist of Britain's Most Influential Black People, 2011, 2012, 2013
- Title: CEO of Alnylam Pharmaceuticals
- Term: since Jan 2022
- Predecessor: John Maraganore
- Mother: Miranda Greenstreet
- Relatives: Ivor Greenstreet

Yvonne Greenstreet is a British biotechnology executive. She is chief operating officer of Alnylam Pharmaceuticals, and on January 1, 2022 became Alnylam's CEO. She is one of a small number of bi-racial women leading a drug company, leading 2,100 full time employees.

== Life ==
Yvonne Greenstreet is the daughter of a Ghanaian mother, Miranda Greenstreet, and a white Englishman. The pair met in the 1950s as students at the London School of Economics. Born in London, she moved to Ghana when her parents were appointed professors at the University of Ghana. She was sent to a girls' boarding school in England, studied medicine at Leeds University and began practicing obstetrics and gynecology in the UK.

Wanting to "impact more than the hundred or so patients I would see in a year", Greenstreet switched career, gaining a masters degree at the INSEAD Business School in France. In 1992 she joined the pharmaceutical firm Glaxo, which later became GlaxoSmithKline (GSK). There she was vice-president and medical director on the executive team of GSK's UK subsidiary. She then became GSK's Senior Vice President and Chief of Strategy and R&D. She was named in the 2011 Powerlist of Britain's Most Influential Black People. In the 2012 Powerlist she was named at number five.

As SVP of medicines development at Pfizer, in 2013 Fast Company named Greenstreet among the 100 'most creative people in business'. She was again named in the 2013 Powerlist of Britain's Most Influential Black People.

Greenstreet became Alnylam's chief operating officer in 2016. In 2021, it was announced that John Maraganore would step down as Alnylam's CEO on January 1, 2022, and would be succeeded by Greenstreet. Under her leadership, the company has launched a $250 million manufacturing expansion and created a fund for emerging scientists at MIT.

== See also ==
- Miranda Greenstreet
- Ivor Greenstreet
