= Zilebesiran =

Experimental drug

Clinical data
- Other names: AD-85481, ALN-85481, ALN-AGT01

Legal status
- Legal status: Investigational

Identifiers
- IUPAC name: sodium;[(2S,4R)-1-[12-[[1-[3-[3-[5-[(2R,3R,4R,5R,6R)-3-acetamido-4,5-dihydroxy-6-(hydroxymethyl)oxan-2-yl]oxypentanoylamino]propylamino]-3-oxopropoxy]-2-[[3-[3-[5-[(2R,3R,4R,5R,6R)-3-acetamido-4,5-dihydroxy-6-(hydroxymethyl)oxan-2-yl]oxypentanoylamino]propylamino]-3-oxopropoxy]methyl]-3-[3-[3-[5-[(2R,3R,4R,5R,6R)-3-acetamido-4,5-dihydroxy-6-methyloxan-2-yl]oxypentanoylamino]propylamino]-3-oxopropoxy]propan-2-yl]amino]-12-oxododecanoyl]-4-hydroxypyrrolidin-2-yl]methyl [(2R,3R,4R,5R)-5-(6-aminopurin-9-yl)-2-(hydroxymethyl)-4-methoxyoxolan-3-yl] phosphate
- CAS Number: 2380166-33-4
- PubChem CID: 155907821
- UNII: E422BH4BRK

Chemical and physical data
- Formula: C_{89}H_{152}N_{16}NaO_{36}P
- Molar mass: 2076.235 g·mol^{−1}
- 3D model (JSmol): Interactive image
- SMILES: C[C@@H]1[C@@H]([C@@H]([C@H]([C@@H](O1)OCCCCC(=O)NCCCNC(=O)CCOCC(COCCC(=O)NCCCNC(=O)CCCCO[C@H]2[C@@H]([C@H]([C@H]([C@H](O2)CO)O)O)NC(=O)C)(COCCC(=O)NCCCNC(=O)CCCCO[C@H]3[C@@H]([C@H]([C@H]([C@H](O3)CO)O)O)NC(=O)C)NC(=O)CCCCCCCCCCC(=O)N4C[C@@H](C[C@H]4COP(=O)([O-])O[C@@H]5[C@H](O[C@H]([C@@H]5OC)N6C=NC7=C(N=CN=C76)N)CO)O)NC(=O)C)O)O.[Na+]
- InChI: InChI=InChI=1S/C89H153N16O36P.Na/c1-54-75(121)78(124)71(100-55(2)109)86(137-54)133-37-17-14-23-63(113)91-31-20-34-94-66(116)28-40-130-49-89(50-131-41-29-67(117)95-35-21-32-92-64(114)24-15-18-38-134-87-72(101-56(3)110)79(125)76(122)60(45-106)139-87,51-132-42-30-68(118)96-36-22-33-93-65(115)25-16-19-39-135-88-73(102-57(4)111)80(126)77(123)61(46-107)140-88)103-69(119)26-12-10-8-6-7-9-11-13-27-70(120)104-44-59(112)43-58(104)48-136-142(127,128)141-81-62(47-108)138-85(82(81)129-5)105-53-99-74-83(90)97-52-98-84(74)105;/h52-54,58-62,71-73,75-82,85-88,106-108,112,121-126H,6-51H2,1-5H3,(H,91,113)(H,92,114)(H,93,115)(H,94,116)(H,95,117)(H,96,118)(H,100,109)(H,101,110)(H,102,111)(H,103,119)(H,127,128)(H2,90,97,98);/q;+1/p-1/t54-,58+,59-,60-,61-,62-,71-,72-,73-,75+,76+,77+,78-,79-,80-,81-,82-,85-,86-,87-,88-;/m1./s1; Key:FUHMXNACFUZXIQ-ZHSRMXMESA-M

Zilebesiran is an investigational new drug developed by Roche and Alnylam that is being evaluated for the treatment of high blood pressure.

It is small interfering RNA that is administered subcutaneously twice annually to lower blood pressure in people already taking other antihypertensive drugs. It works by impeding the synthesis of angiotensinogen in the liver.
