= Ivor Greenstreet =

Ghanaian politician and lawyer (born 1966)

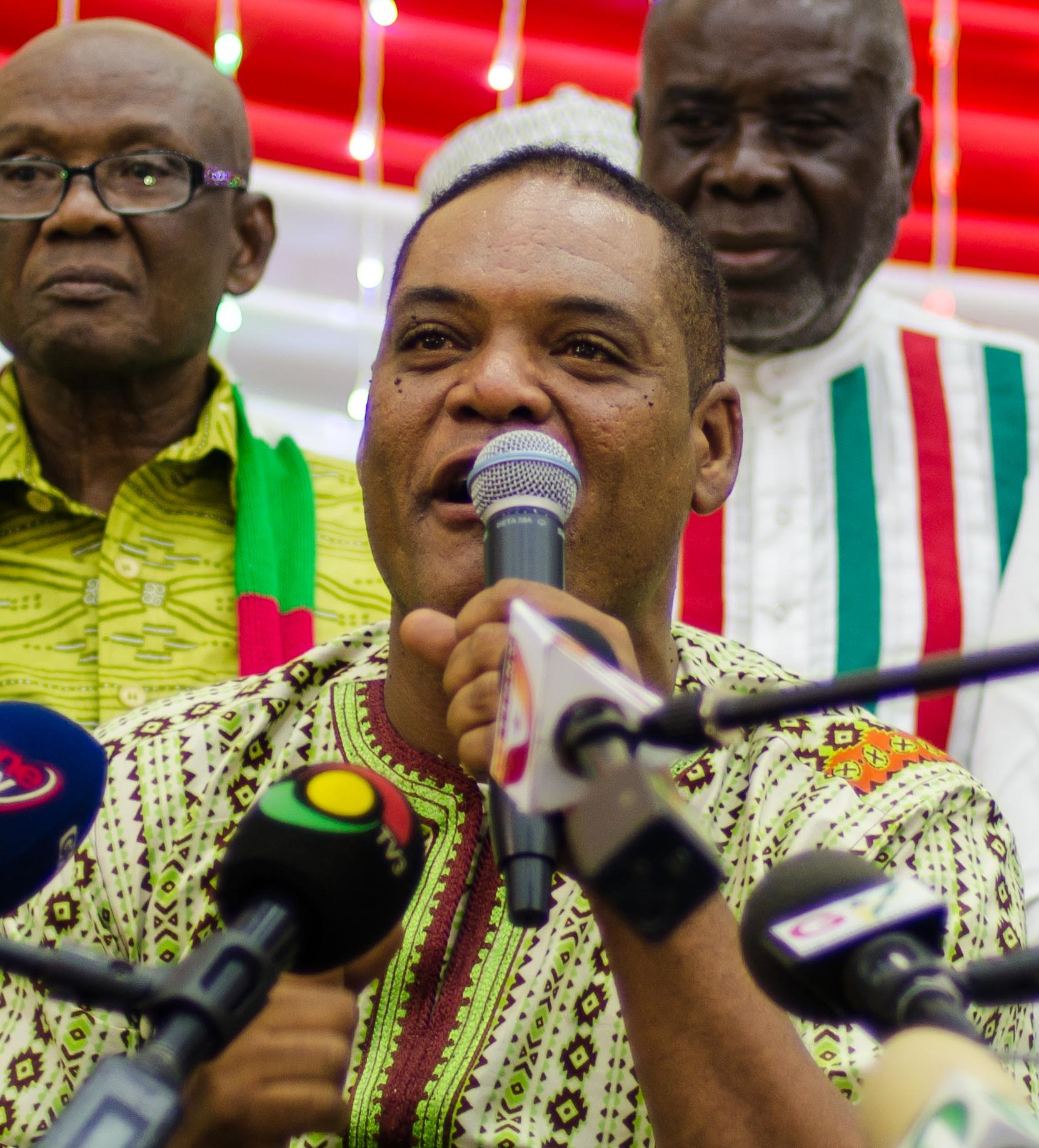
- Greenstreet in 2016 general election

Convention People's Party candidate for President of Ghana
- Election date 7 December 2020
- Running mate: Emmanuel Bobobe
- Opponent(s): Nana Akufo-Addo; John Mahama and 9 others
- Incumbent: Nana Akufo-Addo

Personal details
- Born: 31 May 1966 (age 59) Accra, Ghana
- Party: Convention People's Party
- Children: 2
- Parent(s): Dennis and Miranda Greenstreet
- Relatives: Yvonne Greenstreet (sister)
- Occupation: Politician
- Profession: Lawyer

Ivor Kobina Greenstreet (born 31 May 1966) is a Ghanaian politician and lawyer. He was the Presidential candidate for the Convention People's Party (CPP) in the 2020 Ghanaian general election.

== Early life and education ==
Ivor is the third of four siblings born on 31 May 1966 in Accra at the Korle-Bu Teaching Hospital to Prof. Dennis Greenstreet and Miranda Greenstreet, formerly a professor at the University of Ghana and co-chair of the Coalition of Domestic Election Observers. (CODEO)

He is married to the daughter of late former Vice President Kow Arkaah, who is also a lawyer with three children, a son and two daughters.

He is a native of Ga-Mashie in Accra. He had his early education in Ghana and is an enthusiastic Scuba diver, the first African to participate in an international parachuting event, and a member of the Ghana National Rifle Association. He then left for the UK to read law. On completion, he was called to the Middle Temple and Ghana Bar respectively. In 1997, he was involved in an accident on the Tema Motorway, which resulted in him using a wheelchair till date.

== Early career ==
Ivor is a lawyer by profession and a publisher.

He was called to the Ghana Bar and the English Bar (Inner Temple).

== Politics ==
He is a political militant with the vision of augmenting the rights, freedom and opportunities of the youth, women, and the less privileged. He holds in high esteem self - determination, Pan-Africanism and social justice.

=== Convention People's Party ===
He was an active member of the People's Convention Party (PCP) before the party merged with NCP to form the CPP in 1996. He continued to play various roles in the CPP. In 2004 he was selected by the party as its parliamentary candidate for Ayawaso West Wuogon constituency to contest in the 2004 Ghanaian general election, which he lost to Akosua Frema Osei-Opare of the NPP. He was the first General Secretary to be re-elected twice for the CPP in 2007 and also in 2011. He is an enthusiastic Scuba diver, the first African to participate in an international parachuting event, and a member of the Ghana National Rifle Association (GNRA).

==== 2016 Presidential Bid ====
In January 2016, he contested for the Presidential Nomination to represent the CPP and won with a total vote of 1,288 votes, representing 64.2% of valid votes cast, while his closest contender, Samia Nkrumah, daughter of Ghana's first President Kwame Nkrumah, managed only 579 votes. This victory made him the first physically challenged person to contest for a Presidential election in Ghana. He was the 2016 Ghanaian general election flagbearer for the (CPP). At the end of the election he lost with 25,552 votes representing 0.24 with Nana Akufo-Addo emerging as winner.

==== 2020 Presidential Bid ====
He was re-elected as the flagbearer for the Convention People's Party (CPP) for the 2020 general elections. In October 2020 he chose Professor Emmanuel Bobobe to be his running mate

== See also ==
- Miranda Greenstreet
- Yvonne Greenstreet

Party political offices
Preceded by Abu Sakara	Convention People's Party nominee for President of Ghana; 2016, 2020	Incumbent
