= Doublecortin =

Protein-coding gene in humans

DCX
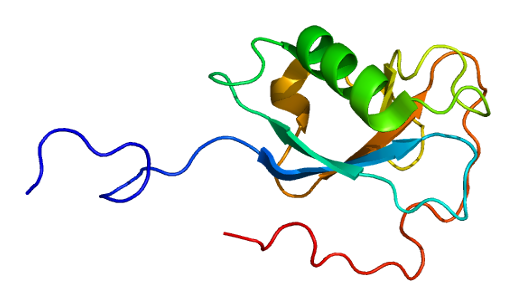

Identifiers
- Aliases: DCX, DBCN, DC, LISX, SCLH, XLIS, doublecortin
- External IDs: OMIM: 300121; MGI: 1277171; GeneCards: DCX
Available structures
PDB	Ortholog search: PDBe RCSB
PDB	List of PDB id codes 4ATU, 1MJD, 2BQQ, 2XRP, 5IN7, 5IOI, 5IKC, 5IP4, 5IO9

Gene location (Human)
Chr.	X chromosome (human)
Band	Xq23	Start	111,293,779 bp
Band	Xq23	End	111,412,429 bp

Gene location (Mouse)
Chr.	X chromosome (mouse)
Band	X|X F2	Start	142,638,838 bp
Band	X|X F2	End	142,716,307 bp
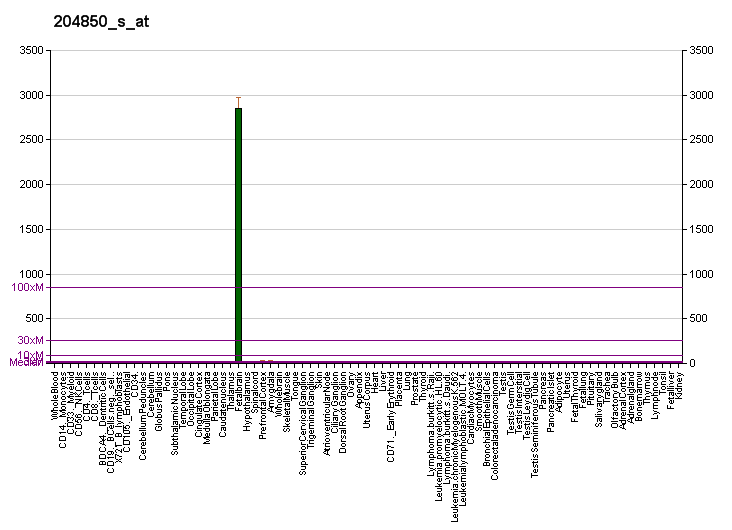

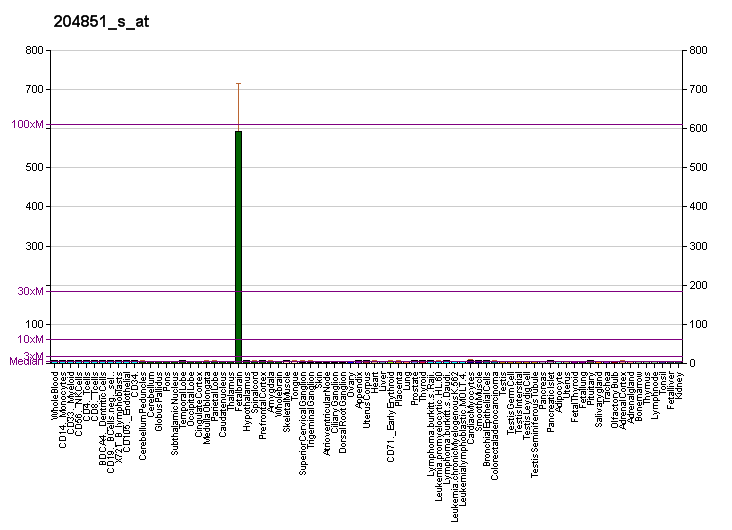
RNA expression pattern
Bgee	Human / Mouse (ortholog); Top expressed in: ganglionic eminence; ventricular zone; tail of epididymis; endothelial cell; Brodmann area 23; middle temporal gyrus; secondary oocyte; primary visual cortex; Brodmann area 10; Brodmann area 46 / Top expressed in: Rostral migratory stream; trigeminal ganglion; barrel cortex; ganglionic eminence; medial ganglionic eminence; superior cervical ganglion; human fetus; fossa; neural tube; olfactory bulb; More reference expression data
BioGPS	More reference expression data
Gene ontology
Molecular function	protein binding; protein kinase binding; microtubule binding
Cellular component	cell projection; microtubule associated complex; microtubule; cytoskeleton; cytosol; neuron projection; cytoplasm; axoneme
Biological process	cell differentiation; nervous system development; multicellular organism development; central nervous system development; neuron migration; intracellular signal transduction; axoneme assembly; photoreceptor cell development; retina development in camera-type eye
Sources:Amigo / QuickGO
Orthologs
Databases	NCBI: entry; OMA: entry
Species	Human	Mouse
Entrez	1641	13193
Ensembl	ENSG00000077279	ENSMUSG00000031285
UniProt	O43602	O88809
RefSeq (mRNA)	NM_000555; NM_001195553; NM_178151; NM_178152; NM_178153 NM_001369370; NM_001369371; NM_001369372; NM_001369373; NM_001369374	NM_001110222; NM_001110223; NM_001110224; NM_010025
RefSeq (protein)	NP_000546; NP_001182482; NP_835364; NP_835365; NP_835366 NP_001356299; NP_001356300; NP_001356301; NP_001356302; NP_001356303	NP_001103692; NP_001103693; NP_001103694; NP_034155
Location (UCSC)	Chr X: 111.29 – 111.41 Mb	Chr X: 142.64 – 142.72 Mb
PubMed search
- Wikidata
View/Edit Human	View/Edit Mouse

Neuronal migration protein doublecortin, also known as doublin or lissencephalin-X, is a protein that in humans is encoded by the DCX gene.

== Function ==
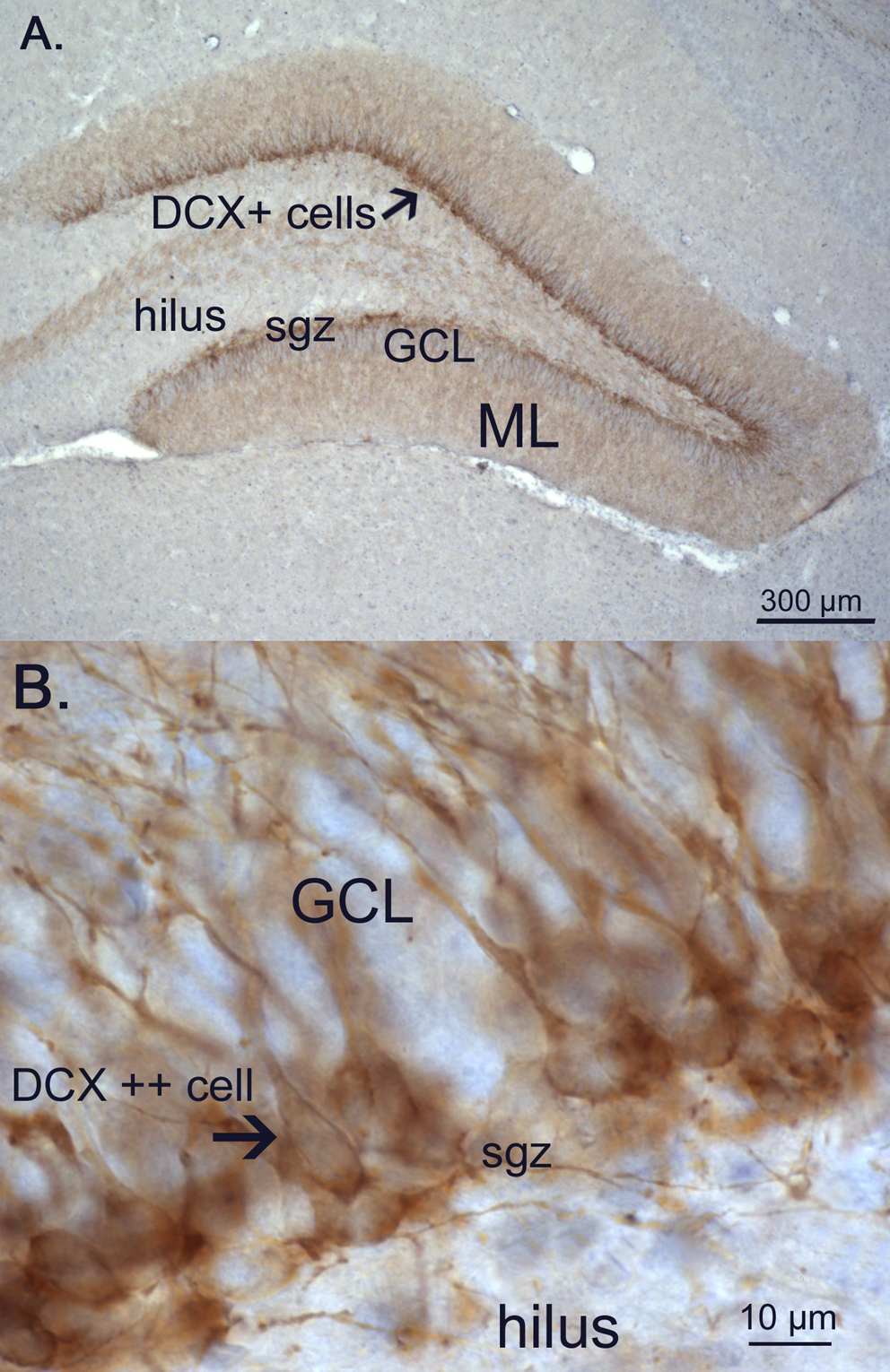
Doublecortin expression in the rat dentate gyrus, 21st postnatal day. Oomen et al., 2009.

Doublecortin (DCX) is a microtubule-associated protein expressed by neuronal precursor cells and immature neurons in embryonic and adult cortical structures. Neuronal precursor cells begin to express DCX while actively dividing, and their neuronal daughter cells continue to express DCX for 2–3 weeks as the cells mature into neurons. Downregulation of DCX begins after 2 weeks, and occurs at the same time that these cells begin to express NeuN, a neuronal marker.

Due to the nearly exclusive expression of DCX in developing neurons, this protein has been used increasingly as a marker for neurogenesis. Indeed, levels of DCX expression increase in response to exercise, and that increase occurs in parallel with increased BrdU labeling, which is currently a "gold standard" in measuring neurogenesis.

Doublecortin was found to bind to the microtubule cytoskeleton. In vivo and in vitro assays show that Doublecortin stabilizes microtubules and causes bundling. Doublecortin is a basic protein with an iso-electric point of 10 typical of microtubule-binding proteins.

== Knock out mouse ==
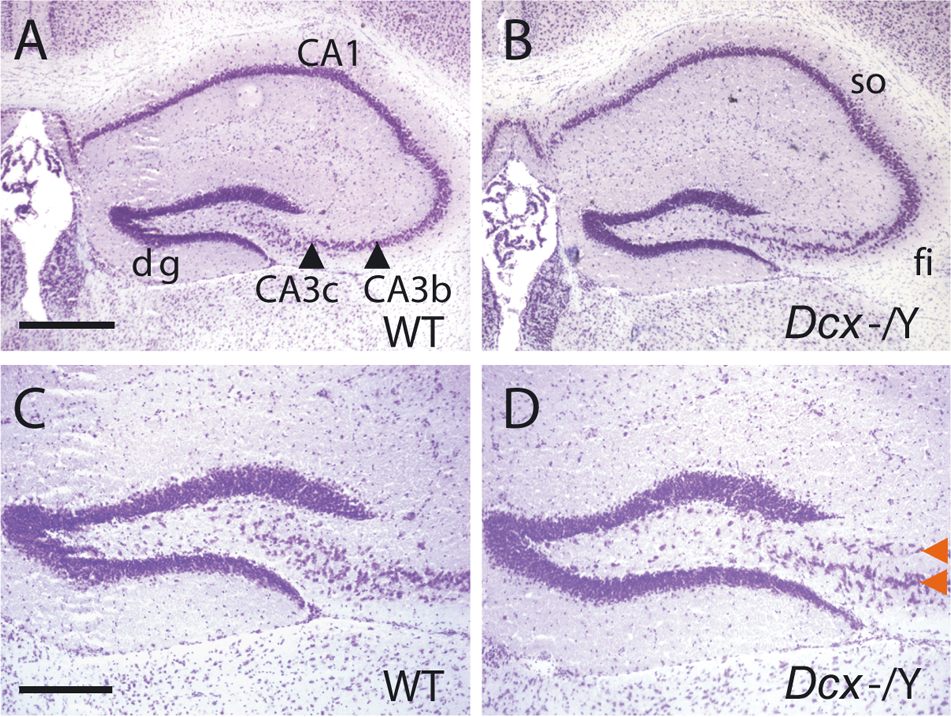
Double layer hippocampus seen in Doublecortin knock out mice (right panels) compared to the normal hippocampus in wild type mice (left panels). Figure extracted from the work of the laboratory of Fiona Francis

In mice where the Doublecortin gene has been knocked out, cortical layers are still correctly formed. However, the hippocampi of these mice show disorganisation in the CA3 region. The normally single layer of pyramidal cells in mutants is seen as a double layer. These mice also have different behavior than their wild type littermates and are epileptic.

== Structure ==
Doublecortin
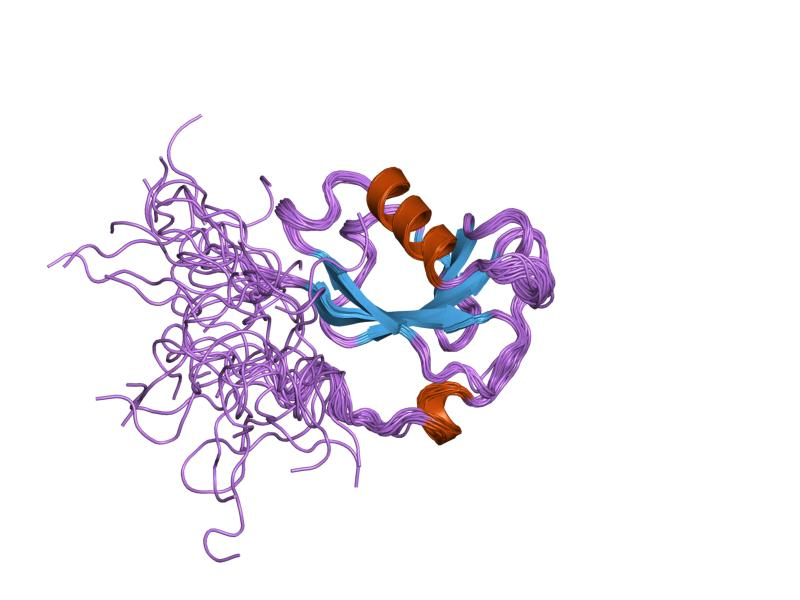
- solution structure of the N-terminal dcx domain of human doublecortin-like kinase

Identifiers
- Symbol: DCX
- Pfam: PF03607
- InterPro: IPR003533
- SCOP2: 1mfw / SCOPe / SUPFAM
- CDD: cd01617
Available protein structures:
- PDB: IPR003533 PF03607 (ECOD; PDBsum)
- AlphaFold: IPR003533; PF03607

The detailed sequence analysis of Doublecortin and Doublecortin-like proteins allowed the identification of a tandem repeat of evolutionarily conserved Doublecortin (DC) domains. These domains are found in the N terminus of proteins and consists of tandemly repeated copies of an around 80 amino acids region. It has been suggested that the first DC domain of Doublecortin binds tubulin and enhances microtubule polymerisation.

Doublecortin has been shown to influence the structure of microtubules. Microtubule nucleated in vitro in the presence of Doublecortin have almost exclusively 13 protofilaments, whereas microtubule nucleated without Doublecortin are present in a range of different sizes.

== Interactions ==
Doublecortin has been shown to interact with PAFAH1B1.

== Clinical significance ==
Doublecortin is mutated in X-linked lissencephaly and the double cortex syndrome, and the clinical manifestations are sex-linked. In males, X-linked lissencephaly produces a smooth brain due to lack of migration of immature neurons, which normally promote folding of the brain surface. Double cortex syndrome is characterized by abnormal migration of neural tissue during development which results in two bands of misplaced neurons within the subcortical white, generating two cortices, giving the name to the syndrome; this finding generally occurs in females. The mutation was discovered by Joseph Gleeson and Christopher A. Walsh in Boston. At least 49 disease-causing mutations in this gene have been discovered.

== See also ==
- Lissencephaly
