= Ionis Pharmaceuticals =

Biotechnology company

Ionis Pharmaceuticals, Inc.
- Formerly: Isis Pharmaceuticals, Inc.
- Type: Public
- Traded as: Nasdaq: IONS; Russell 1000 component
- Industry: Biotechnology
- Founded: 1989; 37 years ago
- Founder: Stanley T. Crooke
- Headquarters: Carlsbad, California, U.S.
- Key people: Brett P. Monia (CEO); Elizabeth L. Hougen (CFO); Joseph Loscalzo (chairman of the board)
- Products: nusinersen, olezarsen, eplontersen, tofersen, inotersen, volanesorsen
- Revenue: ▼US$705.1 million (2024)
- Net income: ▼US$453.9 million (2024)
- Total assets: ▲US$3.003 billion (2024)
- Total equity: ▲US$588.4 million (2024)
- Number of employees: 1,069 (2024)
- Website: ionispharma.com

Ionis Pharmaceuticals, Inc. is a biotechnology company that specializes in discovering and developing antisense therapy, as well as RNA interference and CRISPR therapeutics. The company was founded in 1989 is based in Carlsbad, California. The company was previously known as Isis Pharmaceuticals until December 2015.

== History ==
=== First generation ===
Ionis Pharmaceuticals was founded in 1989 by Stanley Crooke, under the name ISIS Pharmaceuticals, in order to develop antisense therapy. The company started with $5 million in initial funding. It made a series of partnerships with pharmaceutical and biotech businesses early on. Its first major contract was a $30 million drug development agreement with Swiss pharmaceutical company Ciba-Geigy, who also invested in Ionis.

At first, the company developed antisense methodologies in general, without targeting a specific drug or disease. At the time, there was a lot of interest in antisense therapy, but no commercially available pharmaceuticals yet. Ionis went public on Nasdaq in 1991, as a startup with 60 employees at the time.

Ionis grew or shrunk over time depending on the level of public support for antisense therapy. It struggled in the 1990s, as scientific publications and regulators were skeptical of antisense, saying it didn't "making sense." The "first generation" of antisense therapy often had issues with not being potent or long-lasting enough. This made it difficult for Ionis to get grants, research partnerships, or drug approvals.

In 1992, Ionis got approval for the first human testing of an antisense therapy medication, when the Food and Drug Administration allowed testing of a treatment for the human papilloma virus, which causes genital warts. However, in 1995, Ionis abandoned the clinical trials. The company said there wasn't enough of a market for the drug to justify developing the slow-release version. Ionis had a second public offering that year.

ISIS 2302, a treatment for Crohn's disease, was expected to prove the viability of antisense, but instead failed in stage 3 clinical trials in 1999, prompting a layoff of 40% of Ionis' staff. A lung cancer treatment developed in 2003 in partnership with Eli Lily failed clinical trials as well. It took longer than anticipated for Ionis to develop antisense technology to a point where the company made useful medicines.

=== Second generation ===
In the mid-1990s, Ionis and its research partner Ciba-Geigy discovered one of the main reason first-generation antisense medications had potency and duration issues. The phosphorothioates that replace an oxygen molecule in a DNA strand with a sulfur molecule to prompt genetic modification was decreasing the effectiveness of the RNA to bind to cells in order to modify the cell's protein production. Ionis changed its approach by modifying the ribose ring of the DNA strands instead, eliminating the introduction of sulfur. Second generation antisense used a methoxyethyl modification and had five-to-ten times the potency of Ionis' first-generation antisense. This also prompted a shift from focusing on cancer treatments in first-generation antisense to things like heart disease and metabolism issues and allowed patients to take antisense pharmaceuticals in higher doses.

In 1997, ISIS 2302 became the first antisense medication to be effective when injected, rather than applying it directly to the affected area. The following year, Ionis' fomivirsen (Vitravene) became the first antisense therapy drug approved by the FDA. Vitravene was a treatment for an eye condition known as cytomegalovirus (CMV) that affected those with AIDS. It was developed by the National Institute of Health and licensed by Ionis. However, sales were negligible. It was taken by eye injection and relevant to a small number of cases. Vitravene was seen as a vindication of antisense for getting a drug approved, but it was discontinued in 2004. Several other Ionis drugs failed clinical trials afterward.

Ionis started converting its drug development pipeline to second generation technology. Over time, the controversy around antisense faded and support increased. Ionis was able to rehire many of the previously laid-off staff. It started developing 3-5 drugs per-year. Ionis also started rebounding after June 2000, when it presented data from its research into diabetes treatments. Afterwards, it signed a series of big contracts with biotech and pharma companies.

In 1998, competitor Gilead Sciences abandoned antisense research and sold its patents to Ionis. In 2000, one of Ionis' largest backers, Novartis Pharmaceuticals, ended their partnership with Ionis. Many of the larger pharma and biotech companies abandoned research for antisense methodologies. By this time, Ionis was one of the only companies still developing antisense compounds.

=== 2007 - 2022 ===
In 2007, Ionis and Alnylam Pharmaceuticals formed a 50/50 joint venture, Regulus Therapeutics, to research oligomer biotherapeutics to micro-RNA targets. In 2008, Ionis won a $175 million contract to develop a cholesterol drug then-called mipomersen and later branded as Kynamro, in partnership with Genzyme Corporation. Genzyme paid $325 million in a stock and cash deal, plus a $175 million licensing fee and 30-50% royalty on sales. It was Ionis' first "notable success". Mipomersen was rejected by the European Medicines Agency in 2012, but approved by the FDA in 2013. Ionis terminated the agreement with Genzyme in 2016 and sold licensing rights to Kastle Therapeutics.

By this time, Ionis had 26 drugs under development and had just opened a new research and development center in 2011. Ionis earned $325 million from Kynamro that year, which was enough to keep the company solvent. This was followed by a series of more profitable deals. In 2015, the company changed its name from "ISIS" to "IONIS" to avoid confusion with the terrorist group Islamic State of Iraq and the Levant (ISIS).

The cardiovascular division of Ionis was spun-off into a separate company called Akcea in 2017, to help fund IONIS' own research and development. However, after many of its treatments demonstrated early results, Ionis bought Akcea back in 2020. In 2018, Tegsedi was approved by the FDA as a treatment for polyneuropathy. However, a competing drug Onpattro had fewer side effects and took the market from Ionis. Ionis later replaced Tegsedi with a drug called Wainua, which was approved in December 2023. Another Ionis drug, Qalsody, was also approved that year.

In 2021, Ionis signed a deal with AstraZeneca to develop and commercialize eplontersen. The deal involved a $200 million upfront payment and several billion depending on hitting development and sales milestones. In 2022, Ionis entered the field of gene editing for the first time in a partnership with Metagenomi. Ionis paid $80 million for the two to work together on four gene editing projects.

Ionis' first major commercial success was Spinraza, which was approved by the FDA in 2016 to treat spinal muscular atrophy. A clinical trial showed Spinraza could save the lives of babies that would otherwise die before turning two years-old, or at least give them more years of life. Ionis made $327 million from the drug by the following year. However, Ionis only got about 12-18 percent of the billions in revenue from the drug's sales, under its agreement with commercialization partner Biogen. This was criticized by many investors. Ionis had also experienced a series of setbacks when commercialization partners decided not to take viable drugs to market based on corporate decisions by the commercialization partner.

=== Partial independence ===
In 2019, CEO and founder Stanley Crooke resigned from the CEO position to serve as chairman of the board. The board convinced Brett P. Monia to become the new CEO. Monia announced the company would start reducing its reliance on partners and start commercializing its own pharmaceuticals. The company formed its own sales and regulatory teams. Ionis said it would also start launching more pharmaceuticals independently.

In December 2024, Ionis Pharmaceuticals secured FDA approval for Tryngolza (olezarsen), a treatment for familial chylomicronemia syndrome (FCS), a rare and life-threatening genetic condition that prevents the body from properly breaking down fats. Tryngolza marked the first time Ionis brought the drug to market itself, rather than relying on a partner. Ionis intends to eventually get approval to use the drug for a wider range of patients. In 2025, phase 3 clinical trial showed it reduced triglycerides in the body by up to 72 percent as a potential treatment for severe hypertriglyceridemia (sHTG).

In 2025, the FDA approved Dawnzera, a prophylaxis for treating hereditary angioedema, a rare genetic disease that causes unusual swelling.

In September 2026, it also got FDA approval for Zanvastro, the first treatment for a rare neurological condition called Alexander disease (AxD). Meanwhile, its potential heart disease medication, Wainua did not outperform placebos in phase 3 clinical trials. Also, in phase 3 clinical trials, its prospective heart disease medicine called pelacarsen decreased lipoprotein(a), but failed to reduce the risk of cardiovascular events.

== Operations ==
Ionis is a developer of antisense therapy medications, which modify RNA to treat neurological or cardiovascular diseases, or potentially for infectious diseases like cancer, viruses, and inflammatory issues. Antisense therapies provide a segment of genetic code that attaches to messenger RNAs in order to block or increase production of specific proteins in the body. Different methodologies (RNA interference, micro-RNA, and oligonucleotides) are used to modify RNA for different applications. For example, an antisense-based pharmaceutical may bind to the portion of a DNA strand that produces proteins that cause a medical problem, inhibiting production of the proteins, rather than binding to proteins after the cells have already produced them.

Often, Ionis develops a medication for small-scale testing. Then, if a drug shows promise, it finds a partner that pays an up-front fee to support development, plus pays a licensing fee based on volume to use the resulting patents in commercial products. That partner takes over the commercialization of the drug if it is successful. Ionis frequently partners with Biogen for neurological medications, Novartis for cardiology pharmaceuticals, and Roche for phase three clinical trials. However, in 2024 it released its first independently commercialized pharmaceutical, and said it would start reducing its reliance on partners. As of 2024, Ionis also has treatments for FUS-ALS, Angelman, and others in late-stage development that it owns exclusive rights to, without a commercialization partner.

Ionis developed a majority of the most important antisense patents. Many of its first and second generation antisense patents have expired, though it continues to license newer patents for generation 2.5 antisense and ligand conjugated antisense (LICA). It also owns the patents to specific treatments, such as Spinraza, Wainua, Tryngolza, and other medications under development.

Generally, Ionis is not profitable, because the research and development costs exceed the profit from the drugs. It relies on the promise of pharmaceuticals under development.

== Current Products ==
=== Spinraza ===
In December 2016, Ionis's drug nusinersen (Spinraza) was approved by the FDA. It had been discovered in a collaboration between Adrian Krainer at Cold Spring Harbor Laboratory and Ionis (then Isis) and preclinical work was done at University of Massachusetts. The drug was initially developed by Ionis, which partnered with Biogen on development starting in 2012; in 2015 Biogen acquired an exclusive license to the drug for a $75 million license fee, milestone payments up to $150M, and tiered royalties between 10 and 15% thereafter; Biogen also paid for all development subsequent to taking the license. The license to Biogen included licenses to intellectual property that Ionis had acquired from Cold Spring Harbor and University of Massachusetts.

=== Tegsedi ===
In July 2018, the European Commission approved Tegsedi (inotersen) for the treatment of stage 1 or 2 polyneuropathy in adults with hereditary transthyretin-mediated amyloidosis (hATTR). In October 2018, the U.S. Food and Drug Administration (FDA) granted approval for the same indication. Approval was based on the Phase III NEURO-TTR trial, which demonstrated significant improvements in neurological function (mNIS+7 score) and quality of life (Norfolk QoL-DN questionnaire) compared with placebo.

Tegsedi is an antisense oligonucleotide that binds to transthyretin (TTR) mRNA, reducing production of both mutant and wild-type TTR protein. This slows amyloid deposition in peripheral nerves and helps preserve neurologic function. It is administered by weekly subcutaneous injection at a dose of 284 mg and carries a boxed warning for thrombocytopenia and glomerulonephritis. Regular platelet counts and renal monitoring are required; treatment interruption or discontinuation may be necessary in some patients.

While the approval of Tegsedi marked progress for antisense oligonucleotide therapies in systemic amyloidosis, its utility has largely been usurped by newer generation drugs including RNA interference agents (such as patisiran) and next-generation ASOs (such as eplontersen; see below).

=== Waylivra ===
In May 2019, the European Commission granted conditional marketing authorization for Waylivra (volanesorsen) as an adjunct to diet in adult patients with genetically confirmed familial chylomicronemia syndrome (FCS) at high risk for pancreatitis, for whom response to diet and triglyceride-lowering therapy had been inadequate. The approval followed a positive opinion from the EMA’s CHMP in March 2019. Waylivra is an antisense oligonucleotide (ASO) targeting **apolipoprotein C-III (apoC-III) mRNA, reducing apoC-III production which leads to lowers plasma triglyceride levels reduced pancreatitis risk in FCS patients.

In Brazil, Waylivra received regulatory approval as the first treatment for FCS, with innovative drug pricing classification, and PTC Therapeutics submitted applications for a new indication in familial partial lipodystrophy (FPL).

The administration regimen begins with once-weekly subcutaneous injections. After three months, patients with sufficient triglyceride reduction may transition to bi-weekly dosing; further adjustments are made at six and nine months depending on response and platelet monitoring.

Safety concerns have plagued Waylivra, including thrombocytopenia which require regular platelet monitoring. Due in large part to these issues the drug never gained FDA approval in the US.

=== Qalsody ===
In April 2023, the U.S. Food and Drug Administration (FDA) granted accelerated approval to Qalsody (tofersen) for the treatment of amyotrophic lateral sclerosis (ALS) in adults with a mutation in the superoxide dismutase 1 (SOD1) gene. Qalsody is an antisense oligonucleotide designed to bind to SOD1 mRNA and reduce production of the toxic SOD1 protein and is administered via intrathecal injection. Approval was based on reductions in plasma neurofilament light chain (NfL), a biomarker of neurodegeneration, rather than direct clinical improvement. The decision was supported by the Phase 3 VALOR trial and its open-label extension, which showed meaningful biomarker changes despite not meeting primary clinical endpoints. Continued marketing is contingent on confirmatory trials demonstrating clinical benefit. The confirmatory Phase 3 ATLAS trial is ongoing to assess whether early, pre-symptomatic treatment can delay disease onset in individuals with SOD1 mutations. Early real-world data suggest some patients show stabilization or even neurological improvement, though long-term safety and efficacy remain under study.

In May 2024, the European Medicines Agency recommended approval of Qalsody under exceptional circumstances, and the European Commission subsequently granted marketing authorization.

In December 2024, the Centers for Medicare & Medicaid Services (CMS) clarified that Medicare Advantage plans must cover Qalsody, reversing earlier denials that had classified the drug as experimental.

=== Wainua ===
In December 2023, the U.S. Food and Drug Administration (FDA) approved Wainua (eplontersen) for the treatment of the polyneuropathy of hereditary transthyretin-mediated amyloidosis (hATTR-PN) in adults. Wainua is a ligand-conjugated antisense oligonucleotide (LICA) that reduces hepatic production of transthyretin (TTR), mitigating pathogenic amyloid deposition in peripheral nerves. It is administered as a self-administered subcutaneous injection of 45 mg once monthly via auto-injector. Approval was based on the Phase III NEURO-TTRansform trial, which demonstrated that once-monthly 45 mg subcutaneous autoinjector dosing of Wainua led to sustained reductions in serum TTR levels and improvements in neuropathy impairment (mNIS+7) and quality of life (Norfolk QoL-DN) compared to historical controls.

In October 2024, the European Medicines Agency's CHMP issued a positive opinion recommending approval, and Wainua received marketing authorization in the EU in March 2025.

=== Tryngolza ===
In December 2024, Ionis Pharmaceuticals secured FDA approval for Tryngolza (olezarsen), a treatment for familial chylomicronemia syndrome (FCS), a rare and life-threatening genetic condition that prevents the body from properly breaking down fats. This marks a corporate milestone for Ionis, as it prepares for its first independent drug launch in its 35-year history. The approval was based on late-stage trial data showing that Tryngolza effectively reduced triglyceride levels and was generally well-tolerated. Patients receiving the therapy were also less likely to experience pancreatitis, a severe and potentially fatal complication characterized by painful inflammation of the pancreas.

In June 2026, the FDA approved the IONIS drug Tryngolza as a treatment for severe hypertriglyceridemia (sHTG), an expansion on its prior approval for familial chylomicronemia syndrome (FCS), a rare genetic form of sHTG. This was the first drug IONIS commercialized on its own that was for a broad audience, rather than a rare disease.
