= Gerald Glasauer =

German venture capital investor, business angel and philanthropist

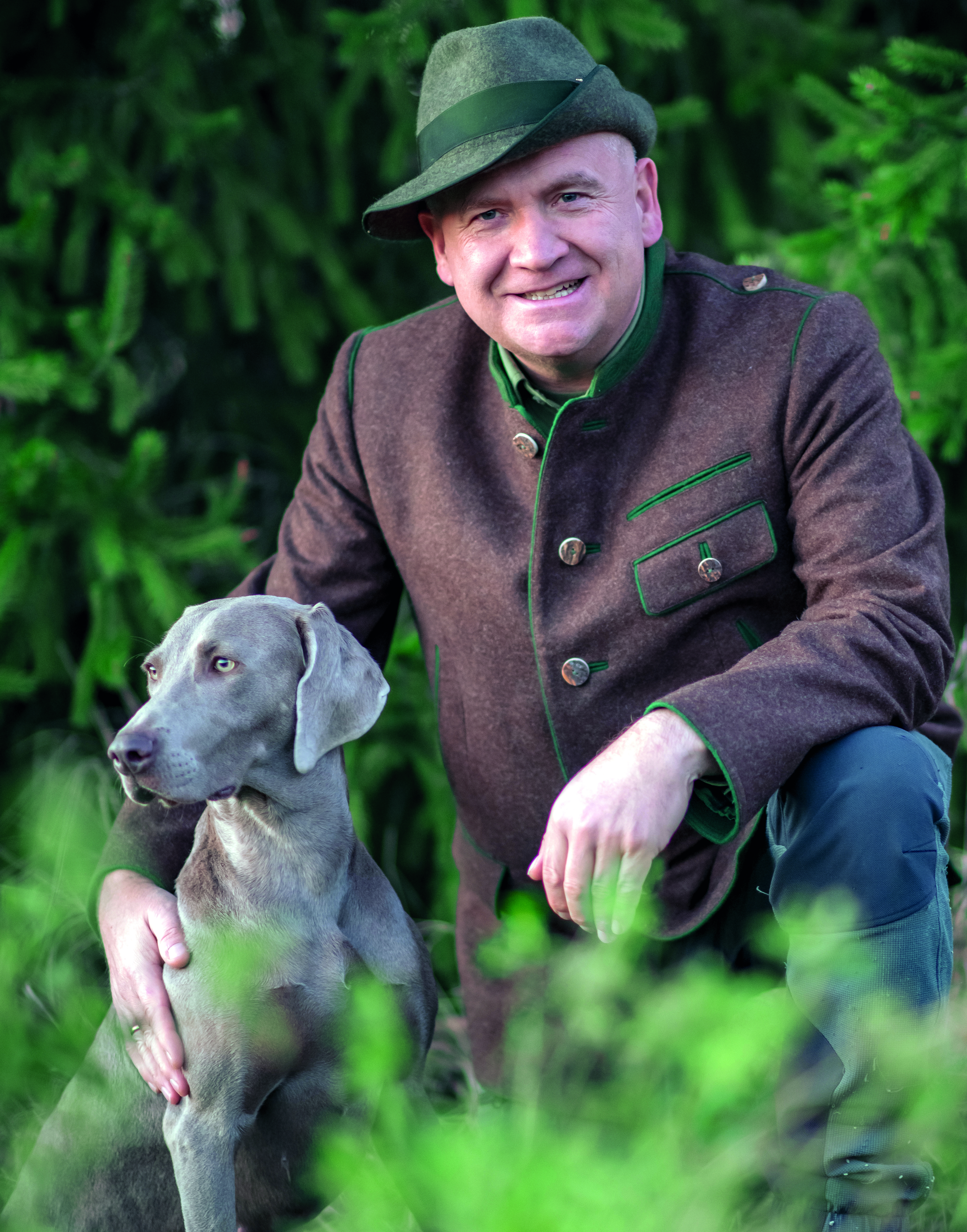
- Born: April 27, 1969 (age 56)
- Occupation(s): Venture Capital Investor and Forest Contractor
- Board member of: GUB Investment Trust

Gerald Glasauer (born April 27, 1969) is a German forest contractor, venture capital investor, business angel and philanthropist.

== Career ==
On October 18, 1994, Gerald Glasauer founded his first venture capital fund called Glasauer Unternehmensbeteiligungen KG as initiator in Schwäbisch Hall. The purpose was to create venture capital investments in young technology businesses. Additionally, after the German reunification and peaceful revolution of Eastern Germany, they invested in technology businesses in Eastern Germany.

Due to the dot-com bubble, the twelve public companies (venture capital funds) that Glasauer launched as the initiator were merged. In this context, Glasauer was criticized by his shareholders. In 2003, a final restructuring occurred in which all twelve funds were merged into one centralized company.

He has invested in more than 100 startups and companies. Among the success cases: Alnylam Pharmaceuticals, NEXUS AG (a software-producer for hospitals) and Natural Dental Implants AG.

Since 1995 Glasauer is active as forest contractor. First, he started reforestation in south Germany. Since 2020 he expand nationwide and operate 10 Square miles own Forest. Glasauer's goal is a species-rich mixed forest in which trees of different age groups grow. Glasauer is an active member of the Association of German Foresters.

Glasauer was active for the German nonprofit organization Manager ohne Grenzen (Managers without borders). He made one mission to Ethiopia in 2010 and two missions to Sri Lanka in 2013 as part of the organization.
