= Kåre Berg =

Norwegian physician

Kåre Ingmar Berg (1 March 1932 – 24 January 2009) was a Norwegian professor in medical genetics, physician-in-chief and well-cited researcher.

== Early life and education ==
Kåre Ingmar Berg was born on 1 March 1932 in Hammerfest. He graduated as MD in 1957 and dr.med. in 1964 at the University of Oslo.

== Career ==
From 1964 to 1967 Berg was a fellow researcher at Rockefeller University, New York.

In 1967 he became the first professor in medical genetics in Norway at the University of Oslo. In 1976 he became head of department of medical genetics at Ullevål University Hospital and held this position until retirement in 2002. In the period 1993-2002 he was physician-in-chief at the Center of Preventive Medicine at Ullevål University Hospital. As a head of department of medical genetics at Ullevål University Hospital, Berg was in many years leader of all genetic prenatal diagnostics in Norway. In addition, he was in charge of genetic counseling of the population of Oslo.

== Research ==
In the early days of his career Kåre Berg discovered the Lipoprotein(a), an inherited component in serum which increases the risk for cardiovascular disease. He maintained the research on Lp (a) throughout life. His other research was focusing on genetics in general and complex diseases like myocardial infarction in particular.

Berg published approximately 650 scientific works, including 10 books and one lexicon. He held more than 120 invited lectures at international meetings, and was invited guest lecturer in approximately 40 universities abroad. In several periods he was a scholar-in-residence at National Institutes of Health in the United States. He continued as a researcher and research mentor after becoming a professor emeritus.

== Commissions and honorary posts ==
Berg was an adviser in genetic diseases and medical ethics in the World Health Organization from 1973. From 1986 Berg headed the WHO Collaborating Centre for Community Control of Hereditary Diseases. Berg was member of the permanent committee for International Congresses in Medical Genetics in the period 1981-1996 and the president of the committee in 1991-1996. He was a national delegate in ethic committees in the European Council from 1987 to 1996 and member of the Norwegian biotechnology advisory board from 1991 to 1998. From 1995 he was a member of the committee of ethics in the Human Genome Organization, and from 2005 as deputy chairman. He was a member of the editorial board for several international journals and editor-in-chief in Clinical Genetics from 1970 to 1997. He was elected as a member of the Norwegian Academy of Science and Letters in 1974, and member of the board from 1975 to 1988.

He was also a member of the board in the Sigurd K. Thoresen Foundation for education and research for inherited diseases from the start in 1977 and chairman from 1994 until he died. He was a member of the board for the Nansen Fund.

== Awards ==
In 1964 Berg received the international Jean Juilliard Prize, and in 1970 the Anders Jahre Prize for Young Scientists "for clarification of certain inherited factors in man".

== Personal life ==
He resided at Grav, later at Skillebekk.

He died in 2009.
