= Arrowhead Pharmaceuticals =

Pharmaceutical Company

Arrowhead Pharmaceuticals, Inc.
- Type: Public
- Traded as: Nasdaq: ARWR; S&P 400 component
- Industry: Biotechnology
- Founded: 1 January 2004
- Headquarters: Pasadena, California, U.S.
- Key people: Christopher Anzalone, Ph.D., (president and CEO)
- Revenue: ▲US$$829.4 million (2025)
- Number of employees: 609
- Website: arrowheadpharma.com

Arrowhead Pharmaceuticals, Inc. is a publicly traded biopharmaceutical company based in Pasadena, California. Arrowhead's products in development act through RNA interference (RNAi) mechanisms of action. The company focuses on treatments for hepatitis B, liver disease associated with alpha 1-antitrypsin deficiency and cardiovascular disease.

== History ==
In 2015, the company substantially expanded its intellectual property holdings through complete acquisition of the full RNAi research and development portfolio, and assets from Novartis.

In April 2016, the company announced a name change from Arrowhead Research Corporation to Arrowhead Pharmaceuticals, Inc.

In September 2016, Arrowhead entered into two collaboration and licensing agreements with Amgen. Under the deals, Amgen received a worldwide exclusive license to Arrowhead's ARO-LPA RNAi program and an option to a worldwide exclusive license for ARO-AMG1, both for cardiovascular disease.

On October 31, 2018, Arrowhead Pharmaceuticals Inc. closed on a $3.7 billion license and collaboration agreement with Janssen to develop and commercialize ARO-HBV. As part of the deal, Arrowhead entered into a research collaboration and option agreement with Janssen to potentially collaborate for up to three more RNA interference (RNAi) therapeutics against new targets to be selected by Janssen.

== Products ==
The company has sixteen products in its pipeline, in various stages of development.

Product	Indication	Development phase	Notes
ARO-HBV	Hepatitis B	In clinic, phase 2	Licensed with Janssen, Phase 2
ARO-AAT	Alpha-1 antirypsin deficiency	In clinic, phase 3	Orphan Drug designation, partnered with Takeda
ARO-APOC3	Hypertriglyceridemia	Phase 2, 3	Orphan Drug designation, Fast Track Designation, Phase 3 for FCS, Phase 2 for expanded populations
ARO-HIF2	Renal cell carcinoma	Preclinical	Second generation being worked on presumably
ARO-ENaC	Cystic fibrosis	Preclinical	Second generation being worked on in preclinic
ARO-ANG3	Dyslipidemia	In clinic, Phase 2	Orphan Drug designation
Olpasiran/ AMG 890	Cardiovascular disease	In clinic, phase 3	Partnered with Amgen
ARO-PNPLA3	NASH	In clinic, Phase 1	License returned to ARWR
ARO-HSD	NASH	In clinic, Phase 1	Licensed to GSK
ARO-C3	Complement Mediated Disease	In clinic, Phase 1	
ARO-MUC5AC	Muco-obstructive	In clinic, Phase 1	
ARO-RAGE	Inflammatory	In clinic, Phase 1	
ARO-MMP7	Idiopathic Pulmonary Fibrosis	In clinic, Phase 1	
ARO-COV	COVID-19	Preclinical	
ARO-DUX4	FSHD	Preclinical	
HZN-457	Gout	In clinic, Phase 1	Partnered with Horizon
