= ARO-HSD =

ARO-HSD, also known as GSK4532990, is a small interfering RNA developed for the treatment of fatty liver disease. Based on the observation that "loss-of-function HSD17β13 mutations protect against the development of chronic liver disease," the therapeutic attempts to induce this loss of function and thus improve liver disease. The therapy is developed by a partnership of GlaxoSmithKline and Arrowhead Pharmaceuticals that might be worth more than $1 billion.
