= Lepodisiran =

Small interfering RNA

Clinical data
- Other names: LY3819469; LY-3819469

Legal status
- Legal status: Investigational

Identifiers
- CAS Number: 2808361-18-2
- UNII: X4BE7S8PN9

Lepodisiran (LY3819469) is a small interfering RNA that was developed to reduce lipoprotein(a) in people at risk of cardiovascular disease. It was developed by Eli Lilly and Company.

As of March 31 of 2025, company trials in phase 2 of randomized, double-blind, placebo-controlled study resulted in significant reduction of genetically inherited cardiovascular risk factors such as heart attacks, strokes, thrombosis, nearly 94% from baseline.
