= John Maraganore =

American scientist and life sciences industry leader

John Maraganore is an American scientist, entrepreneur, and life sciences industry leader. In 2024, John Maraganore won the OTS Lifetime Achievement Award.

== Education ==
John was born in Chicago, Illinois, U.S. in 1962 to Greek immigrant parents. In 1984, he completed his B.A. from University of Chicago in Division of Biological Sciences. In 1985, he completed his M.S. from the University of Chicago in Department of Biochemistry and Molecular Biology. In 1986, Maraganore received his Ph.D. from the University of Chicago in Department of Biochemistry and Molecular Biology.

== Career ==
Maraganore started his career as a post-doctoral research scientist at Upjohn in Kalamazoo, Michigan, in 1985–86. During 1986–87, he was a senior scientist at Zymogenetics in Seattle, Washington. From 1987 to 1997, he was a senior scientist, group leader of thrombosis and hemostasis research, director of biological research, director of market and business development, and program executive at Biogen in Cambridge, Massachusetts. At Biogen, he invented bivalirudin, a direct-acting thrombin inhibitor, later commercialized in the U.S. as ANGIOMAXTM. In 1997, Maraganore joined Millennium Pharmaceuticals and was the general manager of their Biotherapeutics subsidiary until 1999. He then became vice-president of mergers, acquisitions, and strategic planning and led the acquisitions of Leukosite and Cor Therapeutics. In 2000, he was appointed senior vice-president of strategic product development, where he was responsible for program leadership and portfolio strategy.

From 2002 until 2021, John served as the founding chief executive officer and a member of the board of directors at Alnylam Pharmaceuticals. At Alnylam, he led the company’s pioneering efforts to advance RNA interference therapeutics from early research through global approval and commercialization of the first four RNAi therapeutic medicines: ONPATTRO, GIVLAARI, OXLUMO, and LEQVIO. The fifth RNAi therapeutic medicine, AMVUTTRA, was approved in 2021. A sixth RNAi therapeutic invented by Alnylam, QFITLIA, was approved in 2025. At Alnylam, Maraganore forged over 25 major partnerships with leading pharmaceutical and biotechnology companies, raised over $7.5 billion to fund the company’s research, development, manufacturing, and commercialization activities, and built $25 billion in market capitalization value. Over his nearly 20 year leadership tenure, Alnylam became a fully integrated biopharmaceutical company with global operations.

Since his departure at Alnylam, Maraganore is the principal of JMM Innovation, LLC, committed to the advancement of transformative medicines to patients through investment, board and strategic advisory services. He serves as a Venture Partner or Advisor to a number of investment firms including Arch Venture Partners, Atlas Ventures, Blackstone Life Sciences, Jefferies Financial Services, and RTW Investments. He is a director of a number of publicly traded biopharmaceutical companies, including Beam Therapeutics, Hemab Therapeutics, Kymera Therapeutics, Rapport Therapeutics, and Takeda Pharmaceuticals. He is also on the board and/or founder of a number of privately held biotechnology companies, including Aera Therapeutics, Brixton Biosciences, City Therapeutics, Corsera Health, Gemma Biotherapeutics, Mérida Biosciences, Protego Bio, Tevard Biosciences, amongst other companies. He is also a strategic advisor for a number of public and private biotechnology companies advancing biomedical innovation to patients.

Maraganore was the chair of the Biotechnology Innovation Organization also known as BIO from 2017 to 2019, was appointed chair emeritus in 2022, and serves as a member of BIO's board. In addition, he is a director of the Termeer Foundation, which advances the legacy of the late Henri Termeer, on the advisory board of Ariadne Labs, which focuses on health system innovations, a director of Nucleate, a student-led organization facilitating the formation of pioneering life sciences companies, and a director of CHDI Foundation, committed to accelerating therapeutics for Huntington’s Disease. He is also chair of the advisory board for n-Lorem, committed to advancing medicines for patients with nano-rare diseases, and a member of the MGH Research Institute's advisory council. He is on the Advisory Board of the Innovative Genomics Institute at the University of California, Berkeley, serves on the Visiting Committee of the Biology Department for the Massachusetts Institute of Technology, and is Chair of the Therapeutics Discovery Institute at The University of Chicago.

Finally, Maraganore is a mentor to leaders across the biotechnology industry.
