= Michael Abu Sakara Foster =

Ghanaian politician

Dr. Michael Abu Sakara Foster

Leader of the CPP
- In office 2012–2016
- Preceded by: Paa Kwesi Nduom
- Succeeded by: Ivor Kobina Greenstreet

Personal details
- Born: 15 August 1958 (age 68) Damongo, Savannah Region, Ghana
- Party: Convention People's Party
- Education: University of Reading
- Profession: Agronomist
- Website: Voteabusakara.com

Michael Abu Sakara Foster is a Ghanaian agronomist and politician. He was the candidate of the Convention People's Party for the Ghanaian presidential election in December 2012.

Dr. Sakara in 2008 was the running mate to Dr. Paa Kwesi Nduom when he was flag-bearer of the Convention People's Party (CPP) later was elected as flag-bearer when Dr. Nduom left the CPP to found his own party, The Progressive People's Party(PPP).

== Early life and education ==
Michael Abu Sakara Foster was born at Damongo in the Savannah Region (formerly Northern Region) on 15 August 1958. He began school in Kpembe Primary school, East Gonja, at age six and then moved to Sawla Primary school for a short period.

Thereafter he came back to school in Salaga until 1966, after which he was sent to study and live with a friend of his father, Mr and Mrs Foster who were an evangelical missionaries. He entered Yendi Secondary School as a pioneer in 1972.

Under the stewardship of his family he later went to study in the United Kingdom (UK) where he obtained his first degree in Soil Science from the University of Reading in 1982.

Foster obtained his MSc. in Applied Plant Sciences from Wye College, University of London in 1984 and received his PhD in Applied Agricultural Botany from University of Reading in 1987.

== Career ==
Foster's work experience as an Agronomist spans over 29 years of international agricultural development work in Africa and the Americas. He is a specialist in agriculture and rural development (Development Agronomist).

He is the executive director, Rural and Agricultural Development Associates.

== Politics ==
=== 2012 Presidential bid ===
Election 2012 performance

During the election 2012, Dr. Sakara received 20,323 votes out of the 11,246,982 votes cast, constituting 0.18% of the total. In this election also CPP lost the only parliamentary seat they had when Samia Nkrumah the only member of parliament of the party lost her seat at Jomoro in the Western Region.

== Notes ==
Party political offices
Preceded by Paa Kwesi Nduom	Convention People's Party Presidential Candidate; 2012	Succeeded by Ivor Kobina Greenstreet
