= Miranda Greenstreet =

Ghanaian academic and educationist (born 1933)

- Born: Miranda Nahabiah Greenstreet; 1933 (age 92–93)
- Occupations: Academic and Educationist
- Known for: Director of the Institute of Adult Education (now Institute of Continuing and Distance Education)
- Board member of: Coalition of Domestic Election Observers
- Children: Ivor Greenstreet; Yvonne Greenstreet

Academic background
- Education: London School of Economics

Academic work
- Institutions: University of Ghana

Miranda Greenstreet is a Ghanaian academic and educationist.

== Career ==
Greenstreet worked with the University of Ghana and was at the Institute of Adult Education (now Institute of Continuing and Distance Education) where she rose to become the director of the institute. She continued to be a regular contributor to the Annual New Year School organised by the institute.

== Other activities ==
She was the co-chair of the Coalition of Domestic Election Observers (CODEO) together with Justice V. C. R. A. C. Crabbe, a former Supreme Court Judge. She was also a member of the Civil Society Coalition on National Reconciliation in Ghana.

== Personal life and family ==
Miranda was married to Dennis Greenstreet who was English. They met while they were both studying at the London School of Economics in the 1950s. Her son Ivor Greenstreet is a politician and lawyer while her daughter Yvonne Greenstreet is a biotechnology executive and doctor. She was pregnant with Ivor when the Nkrumah government was overthrown on 24 February 1966 by the National Liberation Council military regime. She cited how she was threatened with detention at the time but refused to report to the military authorities after the coup d'état as she saw this as an abuse of her academic freedoms. Another son, Ian Greestreet, is the founder and chairman of Infinity Capital Partners and Member on the advisory board of the London Stock Exchange. She has a daughter, Isobel, who is a dental surgeon. Greenstreet is the granddaughter of Nana Kwame Ofori Kuma who is a member of the Royal house of the Akropong–Akuapem stool.

== Honours ==
- Professor Miranda Greenstreet Prize for the Best Graduating Female Student in the Master of Arts Programme in Adult Education - This is an annual award by the University of Ghana in honour of Miranda Greenstreet who was the Director of the then Institute of Adult Education.

== Publications ==
1. Greenstreet, Miranda (1972). "Social change and Ghanaian women". Canadian Journal of African Studies. 6 (2 - Special Issue: The Roles of African Women: Past, Present and Future): 351–355. ISSN 0008-3968.
2. Greenstreet, Miranda (1972). "Labour conditions in the Gold Coast during the 1930s with particular reference to migrant labour and the mines". Economic Bulletin of Ghana. 2 (2): 32–46. ISSN 0013-0044.
3. Greenstreet, Miranda (1972). Ghana labour: education in relation to productivity and employment. Geneva: International Institute for Labour Studies.
4. Greenstreet, Miranda (1981). Females in the Agricultural Labour Force and Nonformal Education for Rural Development in Ghana. Hague, Netherlands: Institute of Social Studies.
5. Greenstreet, Miranda (1 July 1981). "When Education is Unequal". IDS Bulletin. 12 (3). Sussex: Institute of Development Studies: 14*18.
6. Greenstreet, Miranda (1987). The Ghanaian woman: development through education and family planning. Legon, Ghana: Population Impact Project, University of Ghana.
7. Greenstreet, Miranda (1999). "Empowerment through Education and Reproductive Health Communication in Ghana". Development. 42 (1). Palgrave Macmillan: 67–69. doi:10.1057/palgrave.development.1110015. ISSN 1011-6370. S2CID 86749969.
8. Greenstreet, Miranda (2001). "Social Transformation: Education, Culture and Human Development". Some Critical Development Issues Facing Ghana (Proceedings, 2001). Accra: Ghana Academy of Arts and Sciences.
