= Muvalaplin =

Clinical data
- Other names: LY3473329

Identifiers
- IUPAC name: (2S)-3-[3-[[bis[[3-[(2S)-2-carboxy-2-[(3R)-pyrrolidin-3-yl]ethyl]phenyl]methyl]amino]methyl]phenyl]-2-[(3R)-pyrrolidin-3-yl]propanoic acid
- CAS Number: 2565656-70-2
- PubChem CID: 155369486
- IUPHAR/BPS: 12939
- ChemSpider: 129341115
- UNII: HSU2KY4EFK
- KEGG: D12460
- ChEMBL: ChEMBL4802585
- PDB ligand: A1AAK (PDBe, RCSB PDB)

Chemical and physical data
- Formula: C_{42}H_{54}N_{4}O_{6}
- Molar mass: 710.916 g·mol^{−1}
- 3D model (JSmol): Interactive image
- SMILES: C1CNC[C@H]1[C@H](CC2=CC(=CC=C2)CN(CC3=CC=CC(=C3)C[C@@H]([C@H]4CCNC4)C(=O)O)CC5=CC=CC(=C5)C[C@@H]([C@H]6CCNC6)C(=O)O)C(=O)O
- InChI: InChI=InChI=1S/C42H54N4O6/c47-40(48)37(34-10-13-43-22-34)19-28-4-1-7-31(16-28)25-46(26-32-8-2-5-29(17-32)20-38(41(49)50)35-11-14-44-23-35)27-33-9-3-6-30(18-33)21-39(42(51)52)36-12-15-45-24-36/h1-9,16-18,34-39,43-45H,10-15,19-27H2,(H,47,48)(H,49,50)(H,51,52)/t34-,35-,36-,37-,38-,39-/m0/s1; Key:BRLGERLDHZRETI-BGBFCPIGSA-N

Muvalaplin is an investigational new drug that is being evaluated in clinical trials for the treatment of cardiovascular disease associated with elevated lipoprotein(a) levels.
