= Zerlasiran =

Zerlasiran liver targeting subunit
Clinical data
- Other names: SLN360

Identifiers
- IUPAC name: N-[(2R,3R,4R,5R,6R)-2-[4-[3-[2,2-bis[3-[4-[(2R,3R,4R,5R,6R)-3-acetamido-4,5-dihydroxy-6-(hydroxymethyl)oxan-2-yl]oxybutoxy-hydroxyphosphinothioyl]oxypropoxymethyl]-3-[6-[[(2R,3R,4R,5R)-5-(4-amino-2-oxopyrimidin-1-yl)-3-hydroxy-4-methoxyoxolan-2-yl]methoxy-hydroxyphosphinothioyl]oxyhexoxy]propoxy]propoxy-hydroxyphosphinothioyl]oxybutoxy]-4,5-dihydroxy-6-(hydroxymethyl)oxan-3-yl]acetamide
- UNII: VTF9MMJ8CN

Chemical and physical data
- Formula: C_{66}H_{122}N_{6}O_{38}P_{4}S_{4}
- Molar mass: 1859.84 g·mol^{−1}

Zerlasiran is an investigational new drug that is being evaluated to treat atherosclerotic cardiovascular disease. It is small interfering RNA (siRNA) drug candidate designed to reduce levels of lipoprotein(a).
