= Olpasiran =

Investigational medical therapy

Olpasiran (development code AMG 890, formerly ARO-LPA) is an investigational small interfering RNA (siRNA) therapy developed by Arrowhead Pharmaceuticals and licensed worldwide by Amgen. As of October 2025, it is in phase 3 trials to evaluate whether it reduces cardiovascular risk by lowering lipoprotein(a) (Lp(a)). Olpasiran is under investigation to reduce major adverse cardiovascular events in patients with established atherosclerotic cardiovascular disease (ASCVD) and elevated Lp(a) concentrations, as well as for individuals at high-risk for a first cardiovascular event and elevated Lp(a) concentrations.

== Adverse effects ==
In clinical trials, olpasiran was generally well tolerated. The most frequent adverse events were injection-site reactions, which were usually mild. No major safety signals emerged.

== Mechanism of action ==
Olpasiran is a N-acetylgalactosamine (GalNAc)–conjugated siRNA. After uptake by hepatocytes through the asialoglycoprotein receptor, the antisense strand is incorporated into the RNA-induced silencing complex (RISC), which inhibits expression of the LPA gene. This reduces apolipoprotein(a) production and lowers circulating Lp(a).

Olpasiran is a double-stranded siRNA chemically modified for stability and conjugated with GalNAc to enable hepatocyte targeting.

== History ==
Olpasiran was originally developed by Arrowhead Pharmaceuticals (as ARO-LPA) and licensed to Amgen in 2016. In 2022, Arrowhead sold a portion of its royalty rights to Royalty Pharma.

== Research ==
In a phase 1 trial, one dose of olpasiran led to lower Lp(a) levels sustained for up to 6 months. The phase 2 OCEAN(a)-DOSE trial demonstrated dose-dependent, sustained Lp(a) lowering with acceptable tolerability. In OCEAN(a)-DOSE, olpasiran reduced Lp(a) levels by more than 95% at some doses as compared to placebo, with durable suppression persisting for up to 48 weeks after treatment discontinuation. A large phase 3 cardiovascular outcomes trial began in 2022 to determine whether Lp(a) reduction with olpasiran decreases events in patients with established ASCVD and a history of cardiovascular events.
