= Pelacarsen =

Antisense RNA therapy drug

Clinical data
- Other names: AKCEA-APO(a)-L_{Rx}, IONIS-681257, TQJ 230

Legal status
- Legal status: Investigational

Identifiers
- IUPAC name: all-P-ambo-5'-O-(((6-(5-((tris(3-(6-(2-acetamido-2-deoxy-β-D-galactopyranosyloxy)hexylamino)-3-oxopropoxymethyl))methyl)amino-5-oxopentanamido)hexyl))phospho)-2'-O-(2-methoxyethyl)-5-methyl-P-thiouridylyl-(3'→5')-2'-O-(2-methoxyethyl)guanylyl-(3'→5')-2'-O-(2- methoxyethyl)-5-methylcytidylyl-(3'→5')-2'-O-(2- methoxyethyl)-5-methyluridylyl-(3'→5')-2'-O-(2- methoxyethyl)-5-methylcytidylyl-(3'→5')-2'-deoxy-5-methyl-P-thiocytidylyl-(3'→5')-2'-deoxy-P-thioguanylyl-(3'→5')-P-thiothymidylyl-(3'→5')-P-thiothymidylyl-(3'→5')-2'-deoxy-P-thioguanylyl-(3'→5')-2'-deoxy-P-thioguanylyl-(3'→5')-P-thiothymidylyl-(3'→5')-2'-deoxy-P-thioguanylyl-(3'→5')-2'-deoxy-5-methyl-P-thiocytidylyl-(3'→5')-P-thiothymidylyl-(3'→5')-2'-O-(2-methoxyethyl)-5-methyluridylyl-(3'→5')-2'-O-(2-methoxyethyl)guanylyl-(3'→5')-2'-O-(2-methoxyethyl)-5-methyl-P-thiouridylyl-(3'→5')-2'-O-(2-methoxyethyl)-5-methyl-P-thiouridylyl-(3'→5')-2'-O-(2-methoxyethyl)-5-methylcytidine
- CAS Number: 1637637-70-7

Chemical and physical data
- Formula: C_{296}H_{439}N_{71}O_{163}P_{20}S_{13}
- Molar mass: 8636.36 g·mol^{−1}
- SMILES: C(C)(=O)N[C@H]1[C@@H](O[C@@H]([C@@H]([C@@H]1O)O)CO)OCCCCCCNC(CCOCC(COCCC(NCCCCCCO[C@H]1[C@@H]([C@@H](O)[C@@H](O)[C@H](O1)CO)NC(C)=O)=O)(COCCC(NCCCCCCO[C@H]1[C@@H]([C@@H](O)[C@@H](O)[C@H](O1)CO)NC(C)=O)=O)NC(CCCC(=O)NCCCCCCOP(=O)(O)OC[C@@H]1[C@H]([C@H]([C@@H](O1)N1C(=O)NC(=O)C(=C1)C)OCCOC)OP(=S)(O)OC[C@@H]1[C@H]([C@H]([C@@H](O1)N1C=NC=2C(=O)NC(N)=NC12)OCCOC)OP(=O)(O)OC[C@@H]1[C@H]([C@H]([C@@H](O1)N1C(=O)N=C(N)C(=C1)C)OCCOC)OP(=O)(O)OC[C@@H]1[C@H]([C@H]([C@@H](O1)N1C(=O)NC(=O)C(=C1)C)OCCOC)OP(=O)(O)OC[C@@H]1[C@H]([C@H]([C@@H](O1)N1C(=O)N=C(N)C(=C1)C)OCCOC)OP(=O)(O)OC[C@@H]1[C@H](C[C@@H](O1)N1C(=O)N=C(N)C(=C1)C)OP(=S)(O)OC[C@@H]1[C@H](C[C@@H](O1)N1C=NC=2C(=O)NC(N)=NC12)OP(=S)(O)OC[C@@H]1[C@H](C[C@@H](O1)N1C(=O)NC(=O)C(C)=C1)OP(=S)(O)OC[C@@H]1[C@H](C[C@@H](O1)N1C(=O)NC(=O)C(C)=C1)OP(=S)(O)OC[C@@H]1[C@H](C[C@@H](O1)N1C=NC=2C(=O)NC(N)=NC12)OP(=S)(O)OC[C@@H]1[C@H](C[C@@H](O1)N1C=NC=2C(=O)NC(N)=NC12)OP(=S)(O)OC[C@@H]1[C@H](C[C@@H](O1)N1C(=O)NC(=O)C(C)=C1)OP(=S)(O)OC[C@@H]1[C@H](C[C@@H](O1)N1C=NC=2C(=O)NC(N)=NC12)OP(=S)(O)OC[C@@H]1[C@H](C[C@@H](O1)N1C(=O)N=C(N)C(=C1)C)OP(=S)(O)OC[C@@H]1[C@H](C[C@@H](O1)N1C(=O)NC(=O)C(C)=C1)OP(=S)(O)OC[C@@H]1[C@H]([C@H]([C@@H](O1)N1C(=O)NC(=O)C(=C1)C)OCCOC)OP(=O)(O)OC[C@@H]1[C@H]([C@H]([C@@H](O1)N1C=NC=2C(=O)NC(N)=NC12)OCCOC)OP(=O)(O)OC[C@@H]1[C@H]([C@H]([C@@H](O1)N1C(=O)NC(=O)C(=C1)C)OCCOC)OP(=S)(O)OC[C@@H]1[C@H]([C@H]([C@@H](O1)N1C(=O)NC(=O)C(=C1)C)OCCOC)OP(=S)(O)OC[C@@H]1[C@H]([C@H]([C@@H](O1)N1C(=O)N=C(N)C(=C1)C)OCCOC)O)=O)=O
- InChI: InChI=1S/C296H439N71O163P20S13/c1-137-91-348(282(401)321-237(137)297)192-81-154(167(489-192)108-470-532(417,418)522-218-178(500-264(228(218)456-72-62-443-19)355-94-140(4)240(300)324-285(355)404)120-471-534(421,422)524-220-180(502-266(230(220)458-74-64-445-21)357-100-146(10)252(390)342-291(357)410)122-472-533(419,420)523-219-179(501-265(229(219)457-73-63-444-20)356-95-141(5)241(301)325-286(356)405)121-473-536(425,426)527-223-185(508-272(233(223)461-77-67-448-24)367-136-317-210-247(367)331-281(307)337-262(210)400)126-487-549(440,562)528-224-182(503-268(234(224)462-78-68-449-25)359-102-148(12)254(392)344-293(359)412)119-469-531(415,416)468-57-43-35-31-39-50-308-187(374)45-44-46-191(378)347-296(128-452-58-47-188(375)309-51-36-28-32-40-54-465-273-202(318-151(15)371)215(383)211(379)164(105-368)509-273,129-453-59-48-189(376)310-52-37-29-33-41-55-466-274-203(319-152(16)372)216(384)212(380)165(106-369)510-274)130-454-60-49-190(377)311-53-38-30-34-42-56-467-275-204(320-153(17)373)217(385)213(381)166(107-370)511-275)512-538(429,551)481-114-173-160(87-198(495-173)362-131-312-205-242(362)326-276(302)332-257(205)395)519-544(435,557)479-111-170-156(83-194(492-170)350-96-142(6)248(386)338-287(350)406)514-540(431,553)476-110-169-157(84-195(491-169)351-97-143(7)249(387)339-288(351)407)515-541(432,554)483-116-175-163(90-201(497-175)365-134-315-208-245(365)329-279(305)335-260(208)398)521-546(437,559)484-117-176-162(89-200(498-176)364-133-314-207-244(364)328-278(304)334-259(207)397)520-545(436,558)480-112-171-158(85-196(493-171)352-98-144(8)250(388)340-289(352)408)516-542(433,555)482-115-174-161(88-199(496-174)363-132-313-206-243(363)327-277(303)333-258(206)396)518-543(434,556)478-109-168-155(82-193(490-168)349-92-138(2)238(298)322-283(349)402)513-539(430,552)477-113-172-159(86-197(494-172)353-99-145(9)251(389)341-290(353)409)517-547(438,560)486-125-184-222(231(459-75-65-446-22)267(505-184)358-101-147(11)253(391)343-292(358)411)526-535(423,424)474-123-181-221(232(460-76-66-447-23)271(507-181)366-135-316-209-246(366)330-280(306)336-261(209)399)525-537(427,428)475-124-183-225(235(463-79-69-450-26)269(504-183)360-103-149(13)255(393)345-294(360)413)529-550(441,563)488-127-186-226(236(464-80-70-451-27)270(506-186)361-104-150(14)256(394)346-295(361)414)530-548(439,561)485-118-177-214(382)227(455-71-61-442-18)263(499-177)354-93-139(3)239(299)323-284(354)403/h91-104,131-136,154-186,192-204,211-236,263-275,368-370,379-385H,28-90,105-130H2,1-27H3,(H,308,374)(H,309,375)(H,310,376)(H,311,377)(H,318,371)(H,319,372)(H,320,373)(H,347,378)(H,415,416)(H,417,418)(H,419,420)(H,421,422)(H,423,424)(H,425,426)(H,427,428)(H,429,551)(H,430,552)(H,431,553)(H,432,554)(H,433,555)(H,434,556)(H,435,557)(H,436,558)(H,437,559)(H,438,560)(H,439,561)(H,440,562)(H,441,563)(H2,297,321,401)(H2,298,322,402)(H2,299,323,403)(H2,300,324,404)(H2,301,325,405)(H,338,386,406)(H,339,387,407)(H,340,388,408)(H,341,389,409)(H,342,390,410)(H,343,391,411)(H,344,392,412)(H,345,393,413)(H,346,394,414)(H3,302,326,332,395)(H3,303,327,333,396)(H3,304,328,334,397)(H3,305,329,335,398)(H3,306,330,336,399)(H3,307,331,337,400)/t154-,155-,156-,157-,158-,159-,160-,161-,162-,163-,164+,165+,166+,167+,168+,169+,170+,171+,172+,173+,174+,175+,176+,177+,178+,179+,180+,181+,182+,183+,184+,185+,186+,192+,193+,194+,195+,196+,197+,198+,199+,200+,201+,202+,203+,204+,211-,212-,213-,214+,215+,216+,217+,218+,219+,220+,221+,222+,223+,224+,225+,226+,227+,228+,229+,230+,231+,232+,233+,234+,235+,236+,263+,264+,265+,266+,267+,268+,269+,270+,271+,272+,273+,274+,275+,538?,539?,540?,541?,542?,543?,544?,545?,546?,547?,548?,549?,550?/m0/s1; Key:HQDNGQOXVYGDQE-QGGORHCZSA-N

Pelacarsen
Clinical data
- Other names: AKCEA-APO(a)-L_{Rx}, IONIS-681257, TQJ230, IONIS-APO(a)-LRx, ISIS-APO(a)-LRx

Legal status
- Legal status: Investigational

Identifiers
- IUPAC name: all-P-ambo-5'-O-(((6-(5-((tris(3-(6-(2-acetamido-2-deoxy-β-D-galactopyranosyloxy)hexylamino)-3-oxopropoxymethyl))methyl)amino-5-oxopentanamido)hexyl))phospho)-2'-O-(2-methoxyethyl)-5-methyl-P-thiouridylyl-(3'→5')-2'-O-(2-methoxyethyl)guanylyl-(3'→5')-2'-O-(2- methoxyethyl)-5-methylcytidylyl-(3'→5')-2'-O-(2- methoxyethyl)-5-methyluridylyl-(3'→5')-2'-O-(2- methoxyethyl)-5-methylcytidylyl-(3'→5')-2'-deoxy-5-methyl-P-thiocytidylyl-(3'→5')-2'-deoxy-P-thioguanylyl-(3'→5')-P-thiothymidylyl-(3'→5')-P-thiothymidylyl-(3'→5')-2'-deoxy-P-thioguanylyl-(3'→5')-2'-deoxy-P-thioguanylyl-(3'→5')-P-thiothymidylyl-(3'→5')-2'-deoxy-P-thioguanylyl-(3'→5')-2'-deoxy-5-methyl-P-thiocytidylyl-(3'→5')-P-thiothymidylyl-(3'→5')-2'-O-(2-methoxyethyl)-5-methyluridylyl-(3'→5')-2'-O-(2-methoxyethyl)guanylyl-(3'→5')-2'-O-(2-methoxyethyl)-5-methyl-P-thiouridylyl-(3'→5')-2'-O-(2-methoxyethyl)-5-methyl-P-thiouridylyl-(3'→5')-2'-O-(2-methoxyethyl)-5-methylcytidine
- CAS Number: 1637637-70-7
- UNII: LSO9H7UZ90

Chemical and physical data
- Formula: C_{296}H_{439}N_{71}O_{163}P_{20}S_{13}
- Molar mass: 8636.36 g·mol^{−1}
- SMILES: C(C)(=O)N[C@H]1[C@@H](O[C@@H]([C@@H]([C@@H]1O)O)CO)OCCCCCCNC(CCOCC(COCCC(NCCCCCCO[C@H]1[C@@H]([C@@H](O)[C@@H](O)[C@H](O1)CO)NC(C)=O)=O)(COCCC(NCCCCCCO[C@H]1[C@@H]([C@@H](O)[C@@H](O)[C@H](O1)CO)NC(C)=O)=O)NC(CCCC(=O)NCCCCCCOP(=O)(O)OC[C@@H]1[C@H]([C@H]([C@@H](O1)N1C(=O)NC(=O)C(=C1)C)OCCOC)OP(=S)(O)OC[C@@H]1[C@H]([C@H]([C@@H](O1)N1C=NC=2C(=O)NC(N)=NC12)OCCOC)OP(=O)(O)OC[C@@H]1[C@H]([C@H]([C@@H](O1)N1C(=O)N=C(N)C(=C1)C)OCCOC)OP(=O)(O)OC[C@@H]1[C@H]([C@H]([C@@H](O1)N1C(=O)NC(=O)C(=C1)C)OCCOC)OP(=O)(O)OC[C@@H]1[C@H]([C@H]([C@@H](O1)N1C(=O)N=C(N)C(=C1)C)OCCOC)OP(=O)(O)OC[C@@H]1[C@H](C[C@@H](O1)N1C(=O)N=C(N)C(=C1)C)OP(=S)(O)OC[C@@H]1[C@H](C[C@@H](O1)N1C=NC=2C(=O)NC(N)=NC12)OP(=S)(O)OC[C@@H]1[C@H](C[C@@H](O1)N1C(=O)NC(=O)C(C)=C1)OP(=S)(O)OC[C@@H]1[C@H](C[C@@H](O1)N1C(=O)NC(=O)C(C)=C1)OP(=S)(O)OC[C@@H]1[C@H](C[C@@H](O1)N1C=NC=2C(=O)NC(N)=NC12)OP(=S)(O)OC[C@@H]1[C@H](C[C@@H](O1)N1C=NC=2C(=O)NC(N)=NC12)OP(=S)(O)OC[C@@H]1[C@H](C[C@@H](O1)N1C(=O)NC(=O)C(C)=C1)OP(=S)(O)OC[C@@H]1[C@H](C[C@@H](O1)N1C=NC=2C(=O)NC(N)=NC12)OP(=S)(O)OC[C@@H]1[C@H](C[C@@H](O1)N1C(=O)N=C(N)C(=C1)C)OP(=S)(O)OC[C@@H]1[C@H](C[C@@H](O1)N1C(=O)NC(=O)C(C)=C1)OP(=S)(O)OC[C@@H]1[C@H]([C@H]([C@@H](O1)N1C(=O)NC(=O)C(=C1)C)OCCOC)OP(=O)(O)OC[C@@H]1[C@H]([C@H]([C@@H](O1)N1C=NC=2C(=O)NC(N)=NC12)OCCOC)OP(=O)(O)OC[C@@H]1[C@H]([C@H]([C@@H](O1)N1C(=O)NC(=O)C(=C1)C)OCCOC)OP(=S)(O)OC[C@@H]1[C@H]([C@H]([C@@H](O1)N1C(=O)NC(=O)C(=C1)C)OCCOC)OP(=S)(O)OC[C@@H]1[C@H]([C@H]([C@@H](O1)N1C(=O)N=C(N)C(=C1)C)OCCOC)O)=O)=O
- InChI: InChI=1S/C296H439N71O163P20S13/c1-137-91-348(282(401)321-237(137)297)192-81-154(167(489-192)108-470-532(417,418)522-218-178(500-264(228(218)456-72-62-443-19)355-94-140(4)240(300)324-285(355)404)120-471-534(421,422)524-220-180(502-266(230(220)458-74-64-445-21)357-100-146(10)252(390)342-291(357)410)122-472-533(419,420)523-219-179(501-265(229(219)457-73-63-444-20)356-95-141(5)241(301)325-286(356)405)121-473-536(425,426)527-223-185(508-272(233(223)461-77-67-448-24)367-136-317-210-247(367)331-281(307)337-262(210)400)126-487-549(440,562)528-224-182(503-268(234(224)462-78-68-449-25)359-102-148(12)254(392)344-293(359)412)119-469-531(415,416)468-57-43-35-31-39-50-308-187(374)45-44-46-191(378)347-296(128-452-58-47-188(375)309-51-36-28-32-40-54-465-273-202(318-151(15)371)215(383)211(379)164(105-368)509-273,129-453-59-48-189(376)310-52-37-29-33-41-55-466-274-203(319-152(16)372)216(384)212(380)165(106-369)510-274)130-454-60-49-190(377)311-53-38-30-34-42-56-467-275-204(320-153(17)373)217(385)213(381)166(107-370)511-275)512-538(429,551)481-114-173-160(87-198(495-173)362-131-312-205-242(362)326-276(302)332-257(205)395)519-544(435,557)479-111-170-156(83-194(492-170)350-96-142(6)248(386)338-287(350)406)514-540(431,553)476-110-169-157(84-195(491-169)351-97-143(7)249(387)339-288(351)407)515-541(432,554)483-116-175-163(90-201(497-175)365-134-315-208-245(365)329-279(305)335-260(208)398)521-546(437,559)484-117-176-162(89-200(498-176)364-133-314-207-244(364)328-278(304)334-259(207)397)520-545(436,558)480-112-171-158(85-196(493-171)352-98-144(8)250(388)340-289(352)408)516-542(433,555)482-115-174-161(88-199(496-174)363-132-313-206-243(363)327-277(303)333-258(206)396)518-543(434,556)478-109-168-155(82-193(490-168)349-92-138(2)238(298)322-283(349)402)513-539(430,552)477-113-172-159(86-197(494-172)353-99-145(9)251(389)341-290(353)409)517-547(438,560)486-125-184-222(231(459-75-65-446-22)267(505-184)358-101-147(11)253(391)343-292(358)411)526-535(423,424)474-123-181-221(232(460-76-66-447-23)271(507-181)366-135-316-209-246(366)330-280(306)336-261(209)399)525-537(427,428)475-124-183-225(235(463-79-69-450-26)269(504-183)360-103-149(13)255(393)345-294(360)413)529-550(441,563)488-127-186-226(236(464-80-70-451-27)270(506-186)361-104-150(14)256(394)346-295(361)414)530-548(439,561)485-118-177-214(382)227(455-71-61-442-18)263(499-177)354-93-139(3)239(299)323-284(354)403/h91-104,131-136,154-186,192-204,211-236,263-275,368-370,379-385H,28-90,105-130H2,1-27H3,(H,308,374)(H,309,375)(H,310,376)(H,311,377)(H,318,371)(H,319,372)(H,320,373)(H,347,378)(H,415,416)(H,417,418)(H,419,420)(H,421,422)(H,423,424)(H,425,426)(H,427,428)(H,429,551)(H,430,552)(H,431,553)(H,432,554)(H,433,555)(H,434,556)(H,435,557)(H,436,558)(H,437,559)(H,438,560)(H,439,561)(H,440,562)(H,441,563)(H2,297,321,401)(H2,298,322,402)(H2,299,323,403)(H2,300,324,404)(H2,301,325,405)(H,338,386,406)(H,339,387,407)(H,340,388,408)(H,341,389,409)(H,342,390,410)(H,343,391,411)(H,344,392,412)(H,345,393,413)(H,346,394,414)(H3,302,326,332,395)(H3,303,327,333,396)(H3,304,328,334,397)(H3,305,329,335,398)(H3,306,330,336,399)(H3,307,331,337,400)/t154-,155-,156-,157-,158-,159-,160-,161-,162-,163-,164+,165+,166+,167+,168+,169+,170+,171+,172+,173+,174+,175+,176+,177+,178+,179+,180+,181+,182+,183+,184+,185+,186+,192+,193+,194+,195+,196+,197+,198+,199+,200+,201+,202+,203+,204+,211-,212-,213-,214+,215+,216+,217+,218+,219+,220+,221+,222+,223+,224+,225+,226+,227+,228+,229+,230+,231+,232+,233+,234+,235+,236+,263+,264+,265+,266+,267+,268+,269+,270+,271+,272+,273+,274+,275+,538?,539?,540?,541?,542?,543?,544?,545?,546?,547?,548?,549?,550?/m0/s1; Key:HQDNGQOXVYGDQE-QGGORHCZSA-N

Pelacarsen is an antisense oligonucleotide that is designed to reduce Lipoprotein(a) concentrations in people with high levels of the lipoprotein and who are at risk of cardiovascular disease. It was developed by Ionis Pharmaceuticals and Novartis.

In September 2026, Novartis reported that the phase 3 Lp(a)HORIZON trial of pelacarsen failed to significantly reduce major cardiovascular events, despite reducing levels of lipoprotein(a). The result made it the first major late-stage clinical setback among therapies targeting lipoprotein(a).

=== Other Lp(a)-lowering therapies ===
Pelacarsen is part of an emerging class of investigational therapies designed to lower Lipoprotein(a) by targeting its synthesis in the liver. While pelacarsen utilizes an antisense oligonucleotide (ASO) approach, other therapies in clinical development include small interfering RNAs (siRNAs) such as olpasiran, lepodisiran, and zerlasiran, which also target LPA messenger RNA. Additionally, oral small-molecule inhibitors like muvalaplin are being investigated for their ability to disrupt the assembly of the Lp(a) particle.
