= N-Lorem =

Medical non-profit organization

n-Lorem
- Formation: January 8, 2020
- Headquarters: Carlsbad, California
- CEO: Stanley T. Crooke
- Website: https://www.nlorem.org/

The n-Lorem Foundation is a non-profit organization based in Carlsbad, California, established to develop personalized medicines using antisense RNA in order to treat patients of rare diseases.

== History ==
The organization was founded by Stanley T. Crooke, former CEO of Ionis Pharmaceuticals and head of research at GlaxoSmithKline, in 2020. The n-Lorem Foundation was established in January 2020 with the goal of taking advantage of the technology developed at Ionis to provide experimental treatments to patients suffering from rare genetic disorders. The kind of patients treated at n-Lorem are those with nano-rare diseases, a term used to describe a disease that affects 1-30 people worldwide.

Patients with extremely rare genetic disorders have numerous unique challenges to face when seeking treatment. First, traditional pathways for accessing treatment do not work for such rare diseases. In fact, there are no pathways in place for nano-rare disorders. Second, finding a diagnosis and determining the genetic cause are often significantly more time-consuming than the diagnosis of a patient with a common disease. Physicians look for patterns when diagnosing patients; it is difficult to diagnose a disease that is not in the literature. Third, developing a drug for a smaller patient population is often more expensive. Finally, nano-rare genetic disorders are often rapidly fatal. The development of any drug for treating patients with nano-rare genetic disorders then, must be very efficient in time and price.

Antisense Oligonucleotides (ASOs) are designed to bind to RNA and modify proteins expression. In 2022, n-Lorem teamed up with Columbia University to create Silence ALS, an initiative to develop personalized experimental therapies to treat patients with rare-genetic forms of ALS.

== Mission ==
To bring experimental antisense oligonucleotide (ASO) therapies to patients with extremely rare diseases for free, for life.
