= Coalition of Domestic Election Observers =

The Coalition of Domestic Observers (CODEO) is a network of civil society groups, faith-based organizations, and professional bodies that observe Ghanaian elections to ensure free, fair, and transparent elections. Since its establishment in 2000, CODEO became the largest domestic election observer network in Ghana–consisting of forty-two civil society, professional, and faith-based organizations. CODEO also holds membership with the Global Network of Domestic Election Monitors (GNDEM) and the West African Election Observers Network (WAEON). Despite the long history of both domestic and international election observers in Africa, CODEO has established itself as a continental example for successful election observation and peaceful transitions to democratization.

== History of CODEO ==
The Coalition of Domestic Observers was established in 2000 through the collaboration of the Ghana Center for Democratic Development (CDD-Ghana) and the Friedrich Naumann Foundation (FNF). A variety of fears and anxiety about Ghanaian elections inspired the need for election observation, however, the upcoming 2000 Ghanaian election was the catalyst for the creation of CODEO. Its creation was a direct response to demands for accountability and increasingly responsive governance from civil society. Originally, CODEO consisted of twenty-two civil society, professional, and faith-based organizations–including, but not limited to Federation of Muslim Councils (FMC), the Ghana Bar Association (GBA), and the Institute of Democratic Studies (IDS). Although the 2000 election was the first time that these organizations organized under the name "Coalition of Domestic Election Observers," under the umbrella of CDD-Ghana, they had previously organized during the 1996 Ghanaian election as the Network of Domestic Election Observers (NEDEO). Because the 2000 election had a substantial influence on the creation of CODEO, understanding the complicated history of democratization in Ghana is crucial to grasping the motivations of CDD-Ghana and FNF.

=== 1992 election ===
The third and fourth wave of democratization of the 1980s and 1990s heralded significant change within African elections. Most notable were regime transitions and a shift to multi-party elections. This transition occurred in 1993 in Ghana with the replacement of a quasi-military regime, the Provisional National Defense Council (PNDC) to the National Democratic Congress (NDC) and the first contested election in the country since 1957. It was during his second coup, at the end of 1981, that Jerry John Rawlings would initially assume power. Rawlings established the Provisional National Defence Council (PNDC) which acted as a joint military-civilian government, with Rawlings as the acting chairman. Although the PNDC warranted overwhelmingly strong citizen support, the third and fourth waves of democratization in Africa prompted a switch to democratic systems. In response, Rawlings formed the National Democratic Congress (NDC) as the ruling party ahead of the 1992 election. Running against Rawlings in the 1992 election was Albert Adu Baohen from the New Patriotic Party (NPP), Hila Limann from the People's National Convention (NPC), Kwabena Darko from the National Independence Party (NIC), and Emmanuel Erskine from the People's Heritage Party (PHP). Despite voter turnout remaining relatively low at 50%, Jerry Rawlings won in a landslide, securing 58.3% of the popular vote. While his victory is incredibly significant considering that the election followed Rawlings' 10-year rule, it highlights several issues preventing a successful democracy: voter fraud, performative democracy, and voter participation.

=== 1996 election ===
The 1996 Ghanaian election, although highly anticipated, didn't carry the same weight as the previous election. Considering how the 1992 election established multi-party elections within Ghana, the 1996 elections now held questions about legacy and transitions of power. Although the 1996 election didn't see familiar names, outside of Jerry Rawlings, parties from the last election remained and floated to the top. Competitors included John Agyekum Kuffour of the New Patriotic Party (NPP) and Edward Mahama from the People's National Convention (NPC). Unsurprisingly, Rawlings secured the presidency with 57.4% of the popular vote. It was during this election that the Network of Domestic Election Observers (NEDEO) formed and convened its first meeting. NEDEO included several civic organizations and religious bodies that recognized a need for election observation. For these organizations, voter fraud stood in the way of the free, fair, and transparent elections needed to construct a successful democracy in Ghana.

=== 2000 election ===
Considering that Jerry John Rawlings was in power under the quasi-military regime and remained president after Ghanaian democratization, it wasn't until the 2000 Ghanaian election that fears of unpeaceful democratic alteration of power would occur. If Jerry Rawlings refused to relent power or stirred doubts about a fair election, he could easily set a precedent of conflict and authoritarianism in the country. In light of these fears, the civic organizations and religious bodies that formed the Network of Domestic Election Observers (NEDEO) in the 1996 election reconvened for a second meeting. It was with the assistance of the Ghana Centre for Democratic Development (CDD-Ghana) and the Friedrich Naumann Foundation (FNF) that NEDEO was able to expand and adopt the name Coalition of Domestic Election Observers (CODEO). It was during this turbulent 2000 election that CODEO sought to assist the electoral commission in ensuring free, fair, and transparent elections. Additionally, considering the necessity for a regime change, CODEO acted as a buffer between Ghana and potential election violence. The major competitors in the 2000 election were John Agyekum Kuffour of the New Patriotic Party (NPP), John Atta Mills of the National Democratic Congress (NDC), and Edward Mahama of the People's National Convention (NPC). In the first round of voting, John Agyekum Kuffour won the popular vote by 48% with John Atta Mills trailing behind at 44% of the popular vote. However, during the second round, Kufour defeated Atta-Mills with 57% of the vote. Kufour's victory translated to a significant shift in both the President and the ruling party. For the first time in Ghanaian history, the New Patriotic Party reigned both within the executive branch and parliament. The 2000 election also marked the first peaceful transfer of power via the ballot box in Ghanaian history. This was incredibly significant because it set a precedent for democratic elections within Ghana and prevented major democratic backsliding.

== Structure and membership ==
Starting with a network of only twenty-two organizations, CODEO has now expanded to include forty-two organizations.

CODEO is managed by a sixteen-member advisory board. Along with this advisory board, a large internal team provides project management and CDD-Ghana serves as a secretariat to provide technical and logical support. Although Sheikh Armiyawo Shaibu serves as the acting chairperson on the advisory board, Professor Miranda Greenstreet and Justice V.C.R.A.C Crabbe serve as the current co-chairs of the CODEO Advisory Board.

CODEO currently includes forty-two members, these include a wide range of civil society, faith-based, and professional associations: ABANTU for Development; Amnesty International; Centre for Human Rights and Advanced Legal Research (CHRALER); Chartered Institute of Accountants Ghana; Civil and Local Government Staff Association, Ghana (CLOGSAG); Council for Islamic Education Unit; FIDA-Ghana; Ghana Center for Democratic Development; Ghana Institute of Planners; Ghana Integrity Initiative (GII); Ghana Medical Association (GMA); Ghana Muslim Mission, Ghana Pentacoastal and Charismatic Council (GPCC); Ghana Registered Nurses Association (GRNA); Islamic Council for Development and Humanitarian Servies (ICODEHS); Legal Research Centre (LRC); National Association of Graduate Teachers (NAGRAT); National Union of Ghana Students (NUGS); Penplusbytes/Africa Elections Project; WILDAF Ghana; Ahmadiyya Muslim Mission, Ghana; Association of Ghana Industries (AGI); Centre for the Development of People (CEDEP); Christian Council of Ghana (CCG); Commonwealth Human Rights Initiative, Council of Independent Churches; Federation of Muslim Councils (FMC); Ghana Bar Association (GBA); Ghana Institution of Surveyors; Ghana Journalists Association (GJA); Ghana Muslim Academy, Ghana National Association of Teachers (GNAT); Ghana Registered Midwives Associations (GRMA); Ghana Trades Union Congress (TUC); Junior Chamber-International Ghana; Muslim Dialogue and Humanitarian Organization; National Network of Local Civiv Union (NETCU); Office of National Chief Imam; University Teachers Association of Ghana (UTAG); Youth Bridge Foundation. While not an explicit member organization, CODEO has a list of notable donors including the U.S. Agency for International Development (USAID), the National Democratic Institute (NDI), and the Ford Foundation.

== Importance and accomplishments ==
The Coalition of Domestic Election Observers prides itself on impartially observing every election in Ghana since 2000, including party primaries, local government elections, general elections, and by-elections. The Coalition's observation is crucial both in public confidence and in improving the integrity of the electoral process. Throughout its tenure, CODEO claims numerous nationwide democratic accomplishments, significant improvements in election monitoring technology, and observation beyond Ghana.

Along with domestic election observation, CODEO has expanded beyond Ghana. In 2010, CODEO co-founded the West African Election Observers Network (WAEON). Similar to CODEO, WAEON is a non-partisan, independent organization with CDD-Ghana serving as its secretariat. However, WAEON serves a supporting and strengthening role for Citizen Election Observation Groups in the West African sub-region. Their support of various member organizations encourages election observation and electoral reform and advocacy within their respective countries. CODEO's co-founding of WAEON can be seen as an extension of their inspiration to other African countries. Considering that CODEO is a domestic election observer is incredibly significant because African countries have a legacy of international election observers. However, domestic election observers restore agency and ownership to citizens. They allow citizens to feel empowered in voting and electoral integrity

The Coalition of Domestic Election Observers claims membership to the Global Network of Domestic Election Monitors (GNDEM), along with 251 member organizations in 89 countries and territories. These peer membership organizations include the Coalition for Free and Fair Elections and Sustainable Democracy (CFFESD) in Albania, the Association for the Support of Democracy (EASD) in Egypt, the Kenya Human Rights Commission (KHRC), and others. GNDEM believes thoroughly in the participation and will of citizens as the backbone of the government. GNDEM works to push forward credible and advanced electoral monitoring methodologies that ensure accuracy while preventing voting hindrances. Because of its large membership, GNDEM can pool together a variety of practices from different regional and national monitors to ensure the facilitation of election observation innovations. Through success stories featured online, GNDEM is also able to share the events, programs, and initiatives of their member organizations across the globe.

In 2016, CODEO launched six broad-based projects and citizen support programs with the support of the U.S. Agency for International Development (USAID). The first of these six programs, Domestic Election Observation, is directly related to their mission of Election Observation. This program includes observing each phase of an election, including the pre-election, Election day, and the immediate post-election. CODEO deploys hundreds of election observers to monitor voter registration, the pre-election environment, and polling stations on Election Day.

The second project was the Implementation of a Parallel Vote Tabulation (PVT), aimed at enhancing the quality of Election Day observation. PVT included a random sampling process that deployed observers to polling stations on Election Day to tabulate the results and their accuracy. Not only does PVT provide an incentive for polling stations and candidates to remain integral, but verifies the tabulation results from the Electoral Commission. PVT has been used successfully across the globe as an efficient and scientifically established method of observing important elections.

Among the remaining projects are two specifically aimed at electoral reforms: Advocacy and Education. The Advocacy for the Implementation of Electoral Reforms Program focuses on observing and tracking the implementation of electoral reforms accepted by the Electoral Commission. CODEO wants to ensure that electoral reforms are being implemented fairly and inclusively. Regarding electoral reforms, CODEO worked to deepen citizens' knowledge of electoral reforms through district-level civic and voter education. This education program is aimed at covering both basic information (i.e. casting a ballot correctly) and more advanced material (vote-buying and election peace).

The last two of the six projects include targeted collaboration programs toward vote-buying and parliamentary candidates. Along with STAR-Ghana, and CDD-Ghana, CODEO launched 'Educating the Public on Voting on Policy Issues: Reducing Vote Buying in Election 2016' to promote policy issue campaigning. Overall, the project sought to educate regional electorates to guide voting choices. The Parliamentary Candidates Platform project focuses on elevating the campaigns of parliamentary candidates to ensure post-election accountability and responsiveness. The project specifically highlights campaigns that include policy issues that affect the lives of marginalized communities (women, youth, people living with disabilities, and persons with HIV/AIDS). CODEO is partnering with the Open Society Initiative for West Africa (OSIWA), and CDD-Ghana to complete this project.

== See also ==
- Golos (election monitor)
- Electoral Observation Mission (Colombia)
