= Alnylam Pharmaceuticals =

American biopharmaceutical company

Alnylam Pharmaceuticals, Inc.
- Type: Public
- Traded as: Nasdaq: ALNY; Nasdaq-100 component
- Industry: Pharmaceutical
- Founded: 2002; 24 years ago
- Headquarters: Cambridge, Massachusetts, U.S.
- Key people: Amy Schulman (chair); Yvonne Greenstreet (CEO)
- Revenue: ▲US$3.71 billion (2025)
- Operating income: ▲US$502 million (2025)
- Net income: ▲US$314 million (2025)
- Total assets: ▲US$4.97 billion (2025)
- Total equity: ▲US$789 million (2025)
- Number of employees: 2,500 (2025)
- Website: alnylam.com

Alnylam Pharmaceuticals, Inc. is an American biopharmaceutical company focused on the discovery, development and commercialization of RNA interference (RNAi) therapeutics for genetically defined diseases. The company was founded in 2002 and is headquartered in Cambridge, Massachusetts. In 2016, Forbes included the company on its "100 Most Innovative Growth Companies" list.

== History ==
The company is a spin-off from the Max Planck Institute for Biophysical Chemistry. In 2002, Alnylam was founded by scientists Phillip Sharp, Paul Schimmel, David Bartel, Thomas Tuschl, and Phillip Zamore, and by investors Christoph Westphal and John Kennedy Clarke; John Maraganore was the founding CEO. The company was named after Alnilam, a star in Orion's belt. The spelling was modified to make it unique. In 2003, the firm merged with the German pharmaceutical company, Ribopharma AG. The newly formed company also received $24.6 million in funding from private-equity firms. On February 27, 2004, Alnylam Pharmaceuticals filed for an IPO. The company raised $26 million and began trading as ALNY on the Nasdaq stock exchange.

In 2005, the company partnered with Medtronic to develop drug-device combinations to treat neurodegenerative disorders, and in 2006 with Biogen Idec to develop treatments of progressive multifocal leukoencephalopathy. In 2007, it entered into a nonexclusive alliance with Hoffmann-La Roche, in which Alnylam received $331 million in exchange for access to its technology platform. and also partnered with Ionis Pharmaceuticals to found the company Regulus Therapeutics, focused on microRNA therapeutics.

In 2009, the company formed alliances with Cubist Pharmaceuticals and Kyowa Hakko Kirin to market a drug targeted at respiratory syncytial virus. In 2010, it expanded its previous collaboration with Medtronic to include the CHDI Foundation in its Huntington's disease focused research. In 2011, it partnered with GlaxoSmithKline to develop RNAi technology enhancing vaccine production. The company entered into a 10-year alliance with Monsanto in 2012, to develop biotech solutions for the farming industry by developing natural molecules for crop protection. In 2012, it formed a partnership with Sanofi Genzyme to develop a treatment for transthyretin-mediated amyloidosis, a hereditary disease in Asia. In February 2013, it formed a partnership with The Medicines Company to develop a drug to treat a genetic form of high cholesterol.

In July 2013, during a Phase I trial Alnylam demonstrated statistically significant reduction of a protein called transthyretin, or TTR and demonstrated human efficacy with intravenous and subcutaneous modes of administration. In 2014, Sanofi Genzyme acquired a 12 percent stake in Alnylam and increased its rights to several of the company's drugs for $700 million. In a separate transaction Alnylam announced that it had purchased Merck & Co.'s Sirna Therapeutics, for $25 million cash and $150 million in stock. In 2015, the company had $41 million in revenue and a market cap of $5.2 billion.

In 2016, the company purchased land in Norton, Massachusetts to build a manufacturing facility.

In October 2016 the Phase III clinical trial of the company's lead product, revusiran, was halted due to increased deaths in the drug arm of the trial, and the company said it was terminating development of the compound.

On October 10, 2018, Alnylam appointed Margaret Hamburg to Board of Directors. Prior to this, from May 2009 to April 2015, she had served as Commissioner of the U.S. Food and Drug Administration (FDA).

In February 2020, Alnylam appointed former Sanofi CEO Olivier Brandicourt to its board of directors. In 2021, it was announced that Maraganore would step down as CEO, to be succeeded by the company's chief operating officer, Yvonne Greenstreet, on January 1, 2022.

In December 2021, Alnylam submitted a clinical trial authorisation (CTA) application to the Medicines and Healthcare Products Regulatory Agency in the United Kingdom to initiate a Phase 1 study of ALN-APP, an investigational RNAi therapeutic targeting amyloid precursor protein (APP) for the treatment of Alzheimer's disease and cerebral amyloid angiopathy.

On December 22, 2021, Novartis announced that the US Food and Drug Administration (FDA) approved Leqvio (inclisiran), a small interfering RNA (siRNA) therapy to lower low-density lipoprotein cholesterol. Leqvio is indicated in the United States as an adjunct to diet and maximally tolerated statin therapy for the treatment of adults with clinical atherosclerotic cardiovascular disease (ASCVD) or heterozygous familial hypercholesterolemia (HeFH) who require additional lowering of LDL-C. The effect of Leqvio on cardiovascular morbidity and mortality is being explored in clinical trials currently underway. Novartis obtained global rights to develop, manufacture and commercialize Leqvio under a license and collaboration agreement with Alnylam Pharmaceuticals.

Alnylam still does not earn money, but writes losses. The losses ("GAAP Operating Loss") from Alnylam were around $650 million in the late 2020. Alnylam expects to achieve net profits financially in 2022 or 2023.

In July 2023, Roche partnered with Alnylam Pharmaceuticals in a deal worth $2.8 billion for the development of a hypertension drug.

== Products ==
In 2016, Alnylam Pharmaceuticals had 18 potential treatments in various development stages in genetic medicine, cardiometabolic disease and hepatic infectious disease.

=== Patisiran ===
In late 2016, the company's lead candidate in phase III studies was patisiran, a treatment targeting transthyretin (TTR) for the treatment of TTR-mediated amyloidosis (ATTR), in patients with the compromised nervous system condition of familial amyloidotic polyneuropathy (FAP). In August 2018, with its commercial name Onpattro, patisiran received the U.S. regulatory approval to treat polyneuropathy in patients with hereditary ATTR amyloidosis.

=== FDA on patisiran for cardiomyopathy ===
In September 2023, the FDA raised doubts about the efficacy of patisiran for treating cardiomyopathy associated with transthyretin-mediated amyloidosis (ATTR-CM). The FDA's Cardiovascular and Renal Drugs Advisory Committee meeting is scheduled for September 13, 2023. Although the APOLLO-B study met key endpoints, the FDA questioned the clinical significance of the results particularly for patients not on background therapy with tafamidis. The FDA is seeking the committee's input on the clinical meaningfulness and patient populations for patisiran use potentially challenging Pfizer's tafamidis dominance in ATTR-CM treatment. A decision on Alnylam's application is expected by October 8, 2023. Patisiran was previously approved in 2018 for hereditary ATTR amyloidosis polyneuropathy, becoming the first RNA interference therapeutic approved by the FDA. The committee meeting chose to deny approval for the treatment of cardiomyopathy of ATTR amyloidosis with patisiran. Note that while patisiran was denied for the indication of cardiomyopathy, it remains an FDA approved treatment for polyneuropathy.

=== Vutrisiran ===
Alnylam went on to pursue the development of vutrisiran, which received FDA approval in 2022 and accounted for the majority of reported profit compared to patisiran/Onpattro in 2025.
