= Lipoprotein(a) =

Low-density lipoprotein containing apolipoprotein(a)

LPA
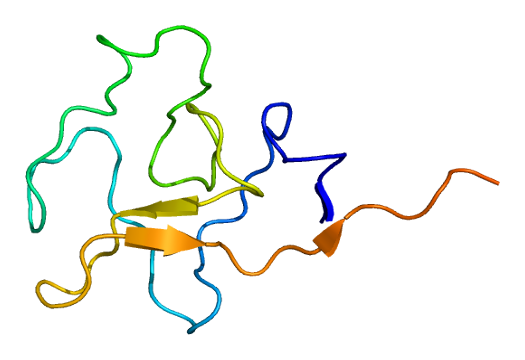

Identifiers
- Aliases: LPA, AK38, APOA, LP, Lipoprotein(a), Lp(a)
- External IDs: GeneCards: LPA
Available structures
PDB	Human UniProt search: PDBe RCSB
PDB	List of PDB id codes 1I71, 1JFN, 1KIV, 2FEB, 4BV5, 4BV7, 4BVC, 4BVD, 4BVV, 4BVW, 3KIV, 4KIV

Gene location (Human)
Chr.	Chromosome 6 (human)
Band	6q25.3-q26	Start	160,531,482 bp
Band	6q25.3-q26	End	160,664,275 bp
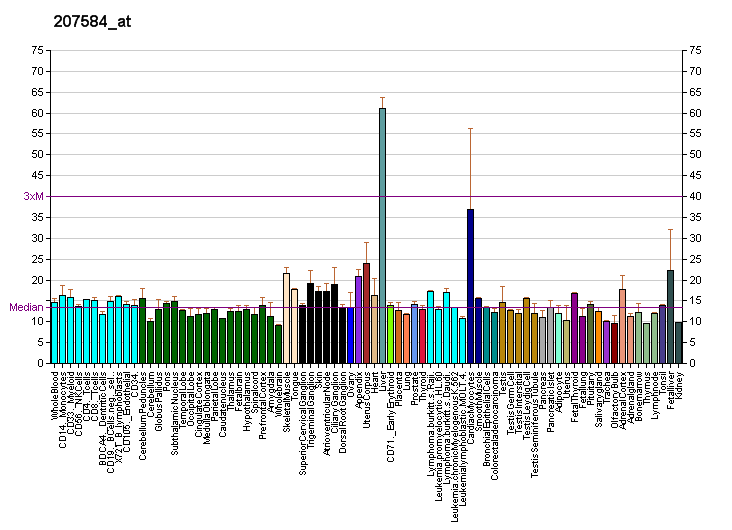
RNA expression pattern
Bgee	Human / Mouse (ortholog); Top expressed in: liver; right lobe of liver; testicle; gonad; palpebral conjunctiva; prefrontal cortex; olfactory zone of nasal mucosa; body of pancreas; human kidney; urinary bladder / n/a; More reference expression data
BioGPS	More reference expression data
Gene ontology
Molecular function	fibronectin binding; apolipoprotein binding; peptidase activity; endopeptidase inhibitor activity; heparin binding; serine-type endopeptidase activity; serine-type peptidase activity; protein binding; hydrolase activity
Cellular component	extracellular region; plasma lipoprotein particle
Biological process	lipid transport; blood circulation; proteolysis; lipid metabolism; negative regulation of endopeptidase activity; low-density lipoprotein particle remodeling
Sources:Amigo / QuickGO
Orthologs
Databases	NCBI: entry; OMA: entry
Species	Human	Mouse
Entrez	4018	n/a
Ensembl	ENSG00000198670	n/a
UniProt	P08519	n/a
RefSeq (mRNA)	NM_005577	n/a
RefSeq (protein)	n/a	n/a
Location (UCSC)	Chr 6: 160.53 – 160.66 Mb	n/a
PubMed search		n/a
- Wikidata
View/Edit Human

Lipoprotein(a) is a low-density lipoprotein variant containing a protein called apolipoprotein(a). Genetic and epidemiological studies have identified lipoprotein(a) as a risk factor for atherosclerosis and related diseases, such as coronary heart disease and stroke.

Lipoprotein(a) was discovered in 1963 by Kåre Berg. The human gene encoding apolipoprotein(a) was successfully cloned in 1987.

== Structure ==
Lipoprotein(a) [Lp(a)] consists of an LDL-like particle and the specific apolipoprotein(a), which is bound covalently to the apoB contained in the outer shell of the particle. Lp(a) plasma concentrations are highly heritable and mainly controlled by the LPA gene located on chromosome 6q25.3–q26. Apo(a) proteins vary in size due to a size polymorphism [KIV-2 VNTR], which is caused by a variable number of kringle IV repeats in the LPA gene. This size variation at the gene level is expressed on the protein level as well, resulting in apo(a) proteins with 10 to more than 50 kringle IV repeats (each of the variable kringle IV consists of 114 amino acids). These variable apo(a) sizes are known as "apo(a) isoforms".

There is a general inverse correlation between the size of the apo(a) isoform and the Lp(a) plasma concentration. One theory explaining this correlation involves different rates of protein synthesis. Specifically, the larger the isoform, the more apo(a) precursor protein accumulates intracellularly in the endoplasmic reticulum. Lp(a) is not fully synthesised until the precursor protein is released from the cell, so the slower production rate for the larger isoforms limits the plasma concentration.

=== Populations ===
Lp(a) concentrations can vary by more than one thousand between individuals, from <0.2 to >200 mg/dL. Scientists have found that this concentration range has been observed in all populations studied. The mean and median concentrations differ among world populations. Most prominently, there is a two- to threefold higher mean Lp(a) plasma concentration in populations of African descent compared to Asian, Oceanic, or European populations. The general inverse correlation between apo(a) isoform size and Lp(a) plasma concentration is observed in all populations. However, it was also discovered that mean Lp(a) associated with certain apo(a) isoforms varies between populations.

In addition to size effects, mutations in the LPA promoter may lead to decreased apo(a) production.

The Atherosclerosis Risk in Communities (ARIC) Study is a community-based cohort from 4 geographically diverse US communities. The ARIC Study found that the proportion of Atherosclerotic Cardiovascular Disease cases potentially attributable to elevated Lp(a) was 10.2% among Black adults compared with 4.7% among White adults. The population-attributable fraction ratio for Black adults compared with White adults was 2.30. Because the hazard ratios for ASCVD associated with higher Lp(a) did not significantly differ between ethnic groups, the ARIC study concluded that these differences appeared to be driven largely by ethnic differences in the distribution of Lp(a) levels.

== Function and pathology ==
Lp(a) is assembled at the hepatocyte cell membrane surface, which is similar to typical LDL particles. However, there are other possible locations of assembly. The particles mainly exist in plasma.

Lp(a) contributes to the process of atherogenesis. The structure of apolipoprotein(a) is similar to plasminogen and tPA (tissue plasminogen activator), and it competes with plasminogen for its binding site, leading to reduced fibrinolysis. Also, because Lp(a) stimulates secretion of PAI-1, it leads to thrombogenesis. It also may enhance coagulation by inhibiting the function of tissue factor pathway inhibitor.

Moreover, Lp(a) carries atherosclerosis-causing cholesterol and binds atherogenic pro-inflammatory oxidised phospholipids as a preferential carrier of oxidised phospholipids in human plasma, which attracts inflammatory cells to vessel walls and leads to smooth muscle cell proliferation. Moreover, Lp(a) also is hypothesised to be involved in wound healing and tissue repair by interacting with components of the vascular wall and extracellular matrix. Apo(a), a distinct feature of the Lp(a) particle, binds to immobilized fibronectin and endows Lp(a) with the serine-proteinase-type proteolytic activity.

Nonetheless, individuals without Lp(a) or with very low Lp(a) levels seem to be healthy. Thus, plasma Lp(a) is not vital, at least under normal environmental conditions. Since apo(a)/Lp(a) appeared rather recently in mammalian evolution — only old world monkeys and humans have been shown to harbour Lp(a) — its function might not be vital, but just evolutionarily advantageous under certain environmental conditions, e.g., in case of exposure to certain infectious diseases.

== Catabolism and clearance ==
The half-life of Lp(a) in circulation is approximately three to four days. The mechanism and sites of Lp(a) catabolism are largely unknown. The LDL receptor has been reported as a receptor for Lp(a) clearance, but is not a major pathway of Lp(a) metabolism under normal or hypercholesterolemic conditions. The kidney has been identified as playing a role in Lp(a) clearance from plasma.

== Disease ==
High Lp(a) in blood correlates with coronary heart disease (CHD), cardiovascular disease (CVD), atherosclerosis, thrombosis, and stroke. However, the association between Lp(a) levels and stroke is not as strong as that between Lp(a) and cardiovascular disease. Lp(a) concentrations may be affected by disease states (for example, kidney failure or autoinflammatory conditions), but are only slightly affected by diet, exercise, and other environmental factors.

Most commonly prescribed lipid-reducing drugs have little or no effect on Lp(a) concentration. Results using statin medications have been mixed in most trials, although a meta-analysis published in 2012 suggests that atorvastatin may be of benefit.

Niacin (Vitamin B_{3}) has been shown to reduce the levels of Lp(a) significantly in individuals with high levels of low-molecular weight Lp(a).

High Lp(a) correlates with early atherosclerosis independently of other cardiac risk factors, including LDL. In patients with advanced cardiovascular disease, Lp(a) indicates a coagulant risk of plaque thrombosis. Apo(a) contains domains very similar to plasminogen (PLG). Lp(a) accumulates in the vessel wall and inhibits the binding of PLG to the cell surface, reducing plasmin generation, which increases clotting. This inhibition of PLG by Lp(a) also promotes the proliferation of smooth muscle cells. These unique features of Lp(a) suggest that Lp(a) causes generation of clots and atherosclerosis.

== Diagnostic testing ==
Numerous studies confirming a strong correlation between elevated Lp(a) and heart disease have led to the consensus that Lp(a) is an important independent predictor of cardiovascular disease. Animal studies have shown that Lp(a) may directly contribute to atherosclerotic damage by increasing plaque size, inflammation, instability, and smooth muscle cell growth. Genetic data also support the theory that Lp(a) causes cardiovascular disease.

The European Atherosclerosis Society recommends that patients with a moderate or high risk of cardiovascular disease should have their Lp(a) levels checked. Any patient with one of the following risk factors should be screened:

- premature cardiovascular disease
- Familial hypercholesterolaemia
- family history of premature cardiovascular disease
- family history of elevated Lp(a)
- recurrent cardiovascular disease despite statin treatment
- ≥3% ten-year risk of fatal cardiovascular disease according to the European guidelines
- ≥10% ten-year risk of fatal and/or non-fatal cardiovascular disease according to the U.S. guidelines

If the level is elevated, treatment should be initiated to bring the level below 50 mg/dL. In addition, the patient's other cardiovascular risk factors (including LDL levels) should be managed optimally. Apart from the total Lp(a) plasma concentration, the apo(a) isoform might be an important risk parameter as well.

Prior studies of the relationship between Lp(a) and ethnicity have shown inconsistent results. Lp(a) levels seem to differ in different populations. For example, in some African populations, Lp(a) levels are higher on average than in other groups, so that using a risk threshold of 30 mg/dl could classify over 50% of the individuals as higher risk. Some part of this complexity may be related to the different genetic factors involved in determining Lp(a) levels. One recent study showed that in different ethnic groups, different genetic alterations were associated with increased Lp(a) levels.

More recent data suggest that prior studies were underpowered. The Atherosclerosis Risk in Communities (ARIC) Study followed 3467 African Americans and 9851 whites for 20 years. The researchers found that an elevated Lp(a) conferred the same risk in each group. African Americans had roughly three times the level of Lp(a); however, Lp(a) also predicted an increased risk of stroke.

Approximate levels of risk are indicated by the results below, although at present, there are various methods by which to measure Lp(a). A standardized international reference material has been developed and is accepted by the WHO Expert Committee on Biological Standardization and the International Federation of Clinical Chemistry and Laboratory Medicine. Although further standardization is still needed, the development of a reference material is an important step toward standardizing results.

Lipoprotein(a) — Lp(a)

Desirable: <14 mg/dL (<35 nmol/L)
Borderline risk: 14–30 mg/dL (35–75 nmol/L)
High risk: 31–50 mg/dL (75–125 nmol/L)
Very high risk: >50 mg/dL (>125 nmol/L)

Lp(a) appears with different isoforms (per kringle repeats) of apolipoprotein; 40% of the variation in Lp(a) levels when measured in mg/dl can be attributed to different isoforms. Lighter Lp(a) are also associated with disease. Thus, a test with simple quantitative results may not provide a complete assessment of risk.

The US FDA has given the Tina-quant® lipoprotein Lp(a) RxDx assay from Roche a Breakthrough Device Designation. The assay is designed to identify patients who may benefit from therapies aimed at decreasing Lp(a) levels.

== Treatment ==
The current simplest treatment for elevated Lp(a) is to take 1–3 grams of niacin daily, typically in an extended-release form. Niacin therapy may reduce Lp(a) levels by 20–30%. However more recent research suggests that the inflammatory effects of the breakdown products of excess niacin lead to an increase in risk of major adverse cardiovascular event.

A meta-analysis suggested that atorvastatin may lower Lp(a) levels. In severe cases, such as familial hypercholesterolemia or treatment-resistant hypercholesterolemia, LDL apheresis may dramatically reduce Lp(a). The goal of the treatment is to reduce levels to below 50 mg/dL. Cost is prohibitively high.

PCSK9 inhibitors lower Lp(a). In the CORALreef Lipids trial, enlicitide reduced Lp(a) by 28%. Four medications are in clinical trials to lower Lp(a), including pelacarsen (80% reduction), olpasiran (95% reduction), lepodisiran (94% reduction), and muvalapin (47-86% reduction).

A meta-analysis of six clinical trials confirmed that flaxseed supplementation modestly lowers Lp(a) levels.

Testosterone is known to reduce Lp(a) levels. Testosterone replacement therapy also appears to be associated with lower Lp(a) levels. Estrogen replacement therapy in post-menopausal women will reduce Lp(a). Raloxifene has not been shown to reduce Lp(a), while tamoxifen has.

L-carnitine may also reduce Lp(a) levels. A systematic review and meta-analysis found a significant reduction with oral but not intravenous carnitine. Other medications that are in various stages of development include thyromimetics, cholesterol-ester-transfer protein (CETP inhibitors), anti-sense oligonucleopeptides and small interfering RNAs (such as Pelacarsen and Olpasiran), and proprotein convertase subtilisin/kexin type 9 (PCSK9) inhibitors.

The American Academy of Pediatrics now recommends that all children between the ages of nine and eleven years old be screened for hyperlipidemia. Lp(a) levels should be considered in children with a family history of early heart disease or high blood cholesterol levels. However, there have not been enough studies to determine which therapies might be beneficial.

== Clinical trials ==
Several investigational new drugs that lower Lp(a) levels are currently being evaluated in clinical trials for the treatment of cardiovascular disease.

Drug	Modality	Mechanism	Dosing / administration	Clinical trial	Trial endpoints
Pelacarsen	Antisense oligonucleotide	Targets LPA mRNA	Subcutaneous injection once monthly	Phase 3 – Lp(a) HORIZON	Time to first occurrence of cardiovascular death, non-fatal myocardial infarction, non-fatal stroke, or urgent coronary revascularization requiring hospitalization
Olpasiran	siRNA (GalNAc-conjugated)	"	Subcutaneous injection every 12 weeks	Phase 3 – OCEAN(a)-Outcomes	Time to first occurrence of coronary heart-disease death, myocardial infarction, or urgent coronary revascularization
Zerlasiran	siRNA	"	Subcutaneous injection; dosing under study (e.g., every 16–24 weeks)	Phase 2 – ALPACAR-360	Placebo-adjusted, time-averaged percent change in Lp(a) from baseline through ~36 weeks
Lepodisiran	siRNA (extended-duration)	"	Infrequent subcutaneous dosing (under study)	Phase 2	Placebo-adjusted, time-averaged percent change in serum Lp(a) from day 60 to day 180
Muvalaplin	Oral small-molecule	Inhibits Lp(a) assembly	Oral, once daily in trials	Phase 2 – KRAKEN	Percent change in Lp(a) from baseline at 12 weeks

== Interactions ==
Lp(a) has been shown to interact with calnexin, fibronectin, and fibrinogen beta chain.

== See also ==
- Lipoprotein – Biochemical assembly for transporting hydrophobic lipid molecules
- Apolipoprotein – Proteins that bind lipids to transport them in body fluids
- Very-low-density lipoprotein – One of the five major groups of lipoprotein
- Combined hyperlipidemia
