= Christopher A. Walsh =

American neurological researcher

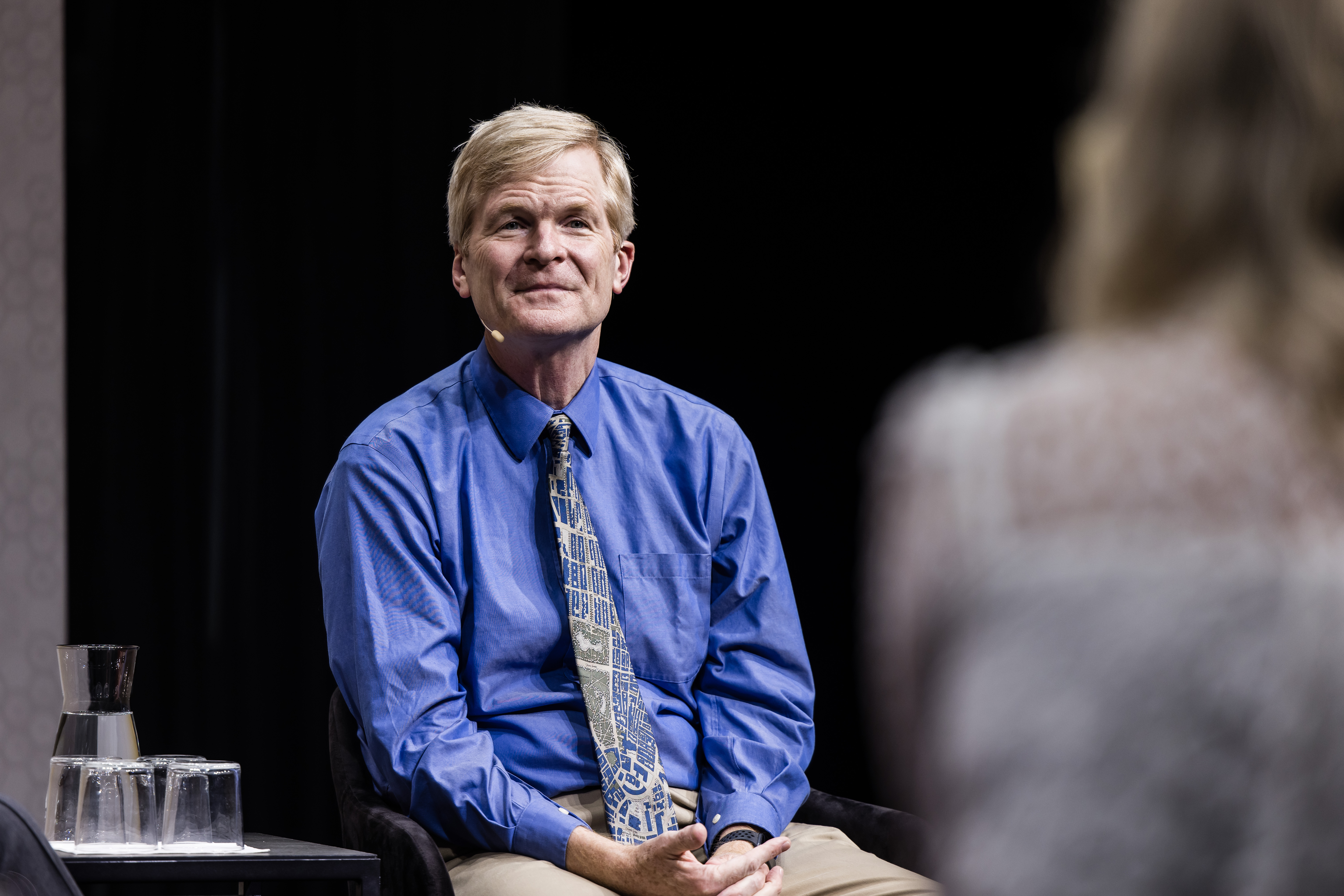
- Born: 1957 (age 68–69)
- Education: Bucknell University
- Awards: Kavli Prize 2022; Gruber Prize in Neuroscience 2021
- Scientific career
- Fields: Genetics, neuroscience
- Workplaces: Harvard Medical School
- Doctoral advisor: Ray W. Guillery

Christopher A. Walsh (born 1957) is the Bullard Professor of Neurology at Harvard Medical School, Chief of the Division of Genetics at Children's Hospital Boston, Investigator of the Howard Hughes Medical Institute, and the former Director of the Harvard–MIT Program in Health Sciences and Technology. His research focuses on genetics of human cortical development and somatic mutations contributions to human brain diseases.

Walsh was a founding Board Member of the International Center for Genetic Disease (iCGD) at Brigham and Women's Hospital, Harvard Medical School, which focuses on the analysis of patients and healthy subjects from different parts of the world for genetics research into human disease and health.

== Early life and education ==
Walsh earned his B.S degree in chemistry from Bucknell University in 1978. He went on to graduate school at the University of Chicago, where he earned his MD (1985) and Ph.D. (1983) in life science in 1988 with Ray Guillery.

== Career ==
Walsh completed a postdoctoral fellowship at Harvard Medical School in 1993 with Constance Cepko, and later that year joined the faculty at Harvard Medical School as a professor of genetics, where he remains to this day. Walsh has authored more than 350 publications in scholarly journals and trained several graduate students and postdoctoral researchers.

In 2018, Walsh was elected to the National Academy of Sciences. In 2021 he received the Gruber Prize in Neuroscience (shared with Christine Petit), and in 2022 he was awarded the Kavli Prize in Neuroscience.

== Notable publications ==
- Fox, Jeremy W; Lamperti, Edward D; Ekşioğlu, Yaman Z; Hong, Susan E; Feng, Yuanyi; Graham, Donna A; Scheffer, Ingrid E; Dobyns, William B; Hirsch, Betsy A; Radtke, Rodney A; Berkovic, Samuel F; Huttenlocher, Peter R; Walsh, Christopher A (1998). "Mutations in filamin 1 Prevent Migration of Cerebral Cortical Neurons in Human Periventricular Heterotopia". Neuron. 21 (6). Elsevier BV: 1315–1325. doi:10.1016/s0896-6273(00)80651-0. ISSN 0896-6273. PMID 9883725. S2CID 2124587.
- Gleeson, Joseph G; Allen, Kristina M; Fox, Jeremy W; Lamperti, Edward D; Berkovic, Samuel; Scheffer, Ingrid; Cooper, Edward C; Dobyns, William B; Minnerath, Sharon R; Ross, M.Elizabeth; Walsh, Christopher A (1998). "doublecortin, a Brain-Specific Gene Mutated in Human X-Linked Lissencephaly and Double Cortex Syndrome, Encodes a Putative Signaling Protein". Cell. 92 (1). Elsevier BV: 63–72. doi:10.1016/s0092-8674(00)80899-5. ISSN 0092-8674. PMID 9489700. S2CID 15941231.
- Shen, Jun; Gilmore, Edward C; Marshall, Christine A; Haddadin, Mary; Reynolds, John J; Eyaid, Wafaa; Bodell, Adria; Barry, Brenda; Gleason, Danielle; Allen, Kathryn; Ganesh, Vijay S; Chang, Bernard S; Grix, Arthur; Hill, R Sean; Topcu, Meral; Caldecott, Keith W; Barkovich, A James; Walsh, Christopher A (January 31, 2010). "Mutations in PNKP cause microcephaly, seizures and defects in DNA repair". Nature Genetics. 42 (3). Springer Science and Business Media LLC: 245–249. doi:10.1038/ng.526. ISSN 1061-4036. PMC 2835984. PMID 20118933.
- Sheen, Volney L; Ganesh, Vijay S; Topcu, Meral; Sebire, Guillaume; Bodell, Adria; Hill, R Sean; Grant, P Ellen; Shugart, Yin Yao; Imitola, Jaime; Khoury, Samia J; Guerrini, Renzo; Walsh, Christopher A (November 30, 2003). "Mutations in ARFGEF2 implicate vesicle trafficking in neural progenitor proliferation and migration in the human cerebral cortex". Nature Genetics. 36 (1). Springer Science and Business Media LLC: 69–76. doi:10.1038/ng1276. hdl:11655/14176. ISSN 1061-4036. PMID 14647276. S2CID 1354890.
- Poduri, Annapurna; Evrony, Gilad D.; Cai, Xuyu; Elhosary, Princess Christina; Beroukhim, Rameen; Lehtinen, Maria K.; Hills, L. Benjamin; Heinzen, Erin L.; Hill, Anthony; Hill, R. Sean; Barry, Brenda J.; Bourgeois, Blaise F.D.; Riviello, James J.; Barkovich, A. James; Black, Peter M.; Ligon, Keith L.; Walsh, Christopher A. (2012). "Somatic Activation of AKT3 Causes Hemispheric Developmental Brain Malformations". Neuron. 74 (1). Elsevier BV: 41–48. doi:10.1016/j.neuron.2012.03.010. ISSN 0896-6273. PMC 3460551. PMID 22500628.
