= Regulus Therapeutics =

Biopharmaceutical company

Regulus Therapeutics Inc.
- Company type: Public
- Traded as: Nasdaq: RGLS
- Industry: Biotechnology
- Founded: September 2007; 18 years ago (by Alnylam Pharmaceuticals (NASDAQ:ALNY) and Isis Pharmaceuticals (NASDAQ:ISIS))
- Headquarters: San Diego, California, U.S.
- Key people: Jay Hagan (president and CEO); Cris Calsada (CFO)
- Products: microRNA therapeutics
- Number of employees: 30
- Website: regulusrx.com

Regulus Therapeutics Inc. is a clinical stage biopharmaceutical company focused on the development of first-in-class drugs that target microRNAs to treat a broad range of diseases. Regulus was established in September 2007 by Alnylam Pharmaceuticals and Isis Pharmaceuticals.

On June 25, 2025, two months after reporting that it had reached an agreement, Novartis announced the completion of its purchase of the company.

== microRNA explained ==
MicroRNAs are small naturally occurring RNA molecules, typically 20 to 25 nucleotides in length, that do not encode proteins but instead have evolved to regulate gene expression.

== anti-miR therapeutics ==
Anti-miR therapeutics inhibit specific microRNA targets. Animal models showed that modulating microRNAs through anti-miRs effectively regulates biological processes and provides therapeutic benefit to cardiac dysfunction, cancer and hepatitis C virus infection. Administration of anti-miR oligonucleotides is possible through local or parenteral injection. The company's lead drug candidate, farabursen (RGLS8429), is in development for autosomal dominant polycystic kidney disease.

== Strategic alliances ==
In April 2008, Regulus and GlaxoSmithKline (GSK) entered into a microRNA-focused strategic alliance for the discovery, development and commercialization of novel microRNA-targeted therapeutics to treat inflammatory diseases such as rheumatoid arthritis. In February 2010, Regulus and GSK announced a new collaboration to develop and commercialize microRNA therapeutics targeting microRNA-122 (miR-122) for the treatment of hepatitis C (HCV) infection. Most recently, the multinational pharmaceutical giant Sanofi –Aventis awarded Regulus with the largest microRNA partnership to date – targeting fibrosis.

== Research collaborations ==
Regulus has active collaborations with leading academic researchers from over 30 academic research laboratories globally.

== Patents ==
Regulus has more than 900 patents and patent applications, 600 of which cover the method of use, chemical modification and administration of oligonucleotides to address specific targets.
