= Anti-miRNA oligonucleotides =

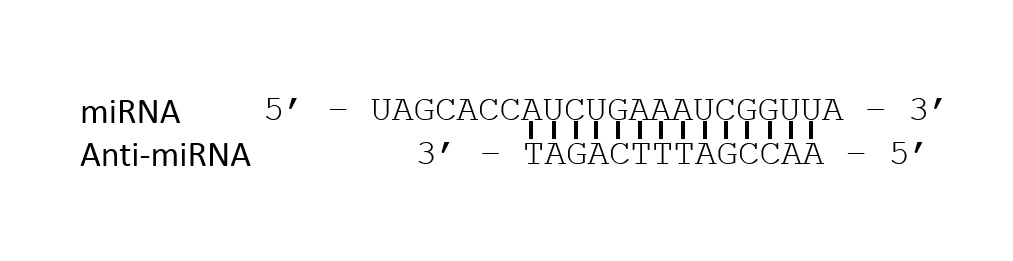
This image is an illustration of the Anti-miRNA bound to miRNA through hybridization. This is one of the couple ways in which AMOs can interact with miRNA in the body. By the hybridization of the miRNA sequence, the function of the miRNA sequence is neutralized by preventing its selective binding to the target genetic information. Although this diagram illustrates only the genetic base pairing between miRNA and anti-miRNA sequences, there are specific chemical modifications that are placed on the 3' and 5' ends of the anti-miRNA.

Anti-miRNA oligonucleotides (also known as AMOs) have many uses in cellular mechanics. These synthetically designed molecules are used to neutralize microRNA (miRNA) function in cells for desired responses. miRNA are complementary sequences (≈22 bp) to mRNA that are involved in the cleavage of RNA or the suppression of the translation. By controlling the miRNA that regulate mRNAs in cells, AMOs can be used as further regulation as well as for therapeutic treatment for certain cellular disorders. This regulation can occur through a steric blocking mechanism as well as hybridization to miRNA. These interactions, within the body between miRNA and AMOs, can be for therapeutics in disorders in which over/under expression occurs or aberrations in miRNA lead to coding issues. Some of the miRNA linked disorders that are encountered in the humans include cancers, muscular diseases, autoimmune disorders, and viruses. In order to determine the functionality of certain AMOs, the AMO/miRNA binding expression (transcript concentration) must be measured against the expressions of the isolated miRNA. The direct detection of differing levels of genetic expression allow the relationship between AMOs and miRNAs to be shown. This can be detected through luciferase activity (bioluminescence in response to targeted enzymatic activity). Understanding the miRNA sequences involved in these diseases can allow us to use anti miRNA Oligonucleotides to disrupt pathways that lead to the under/over expression of proteins of cells that can cause symptoms for these diseases.

== Synthesis ==
During anti-miRNA oligonucleotide design, necessary modifications to optimize binding affinity, improve nuclease resistance, and in vivo delivery must be considered. There have been several generations of designs with attempts to develop AMOs with high binding affinity as well as high specificity. The first generation utilized 2’-O-Methyl RNA nucleotides with phosphorothioate internucleotide linkages positioned at both ends to prevent exonuclease attack. A recent study discovered a compound, N,N-diethyl-4-(4-nitronaphthalen-1-ylazo)-phenylamine (ZEN), that improved binding affinity and blocked exonuclease degradation. This method was combined with the first generation design to create a new generation ZEN-AMO with an improved effectiveness.

Various components of AMOs can be manipulated to affect the binding affinity and potency of the AMO. The 2’-sugar of the AMOs can be modified to be substituted with fluorine and various methyl groups, almost all with an increase in binding affinity. However, some of these modified 2’-sugar AMOs led to negative effects on cell growth. Modifying the 5'-3' phosphodiester backbone linkage to a phosphorothiorate (P-S) backbone linkage was also shown to have an effect on target affinity. Using the P-S mutation was shown to decrease the Tm of the oligonucleotide, which leads to a lower target affinity. A final requirement for AMOs is mismatch specificity and length restrictions. Due to miRNAs in the same families sharing “seed” (shared) sequences and differ by only a couple of additional nucleotides; one AMO can potentially target multiple miRNA sequences. However, studies have suggested that this is difficult due to the loss of activity with single nucleotide mismatches. Greater than three mismatches demonstrates complete loss of activity. Changes in the length of AMOs were tolerated far better, with changes of one nucleotide and two nucleotides resulting in little loss of activity and three or more in total loss of activity. Truncating a single nucleotide from the 3’ end resulted in a slight improvement of AMO activity.

== Antagomirs ==
Antagomirs, also known as anti-miRs, are a class of chemically engineered anti-miRNA oligonucleotides designed to silence endogenous microRNAs. Their structure has modifications so as to make them more resistant to degradation. These include 2'-methoxy groups on the ribose sugar, backbones with phosphorothioate bonds, and cholesterol conjugation on the 3' end.

Blockmirs are similarly engineered molecules which, on the other hand, are designed to have a sequence that is complementary to an mRNA sequence that is targeted by a microRNA. Upon binding to an untranslated region of an mRNA, blockmirs sterically block microRNAs from binding to the same site. Because blockmirs bind individual mRNAs and not miRNAs, their activity is more predictable than antagomirs' and less likely to cause off-target effects.

== Delivery and Detection ==
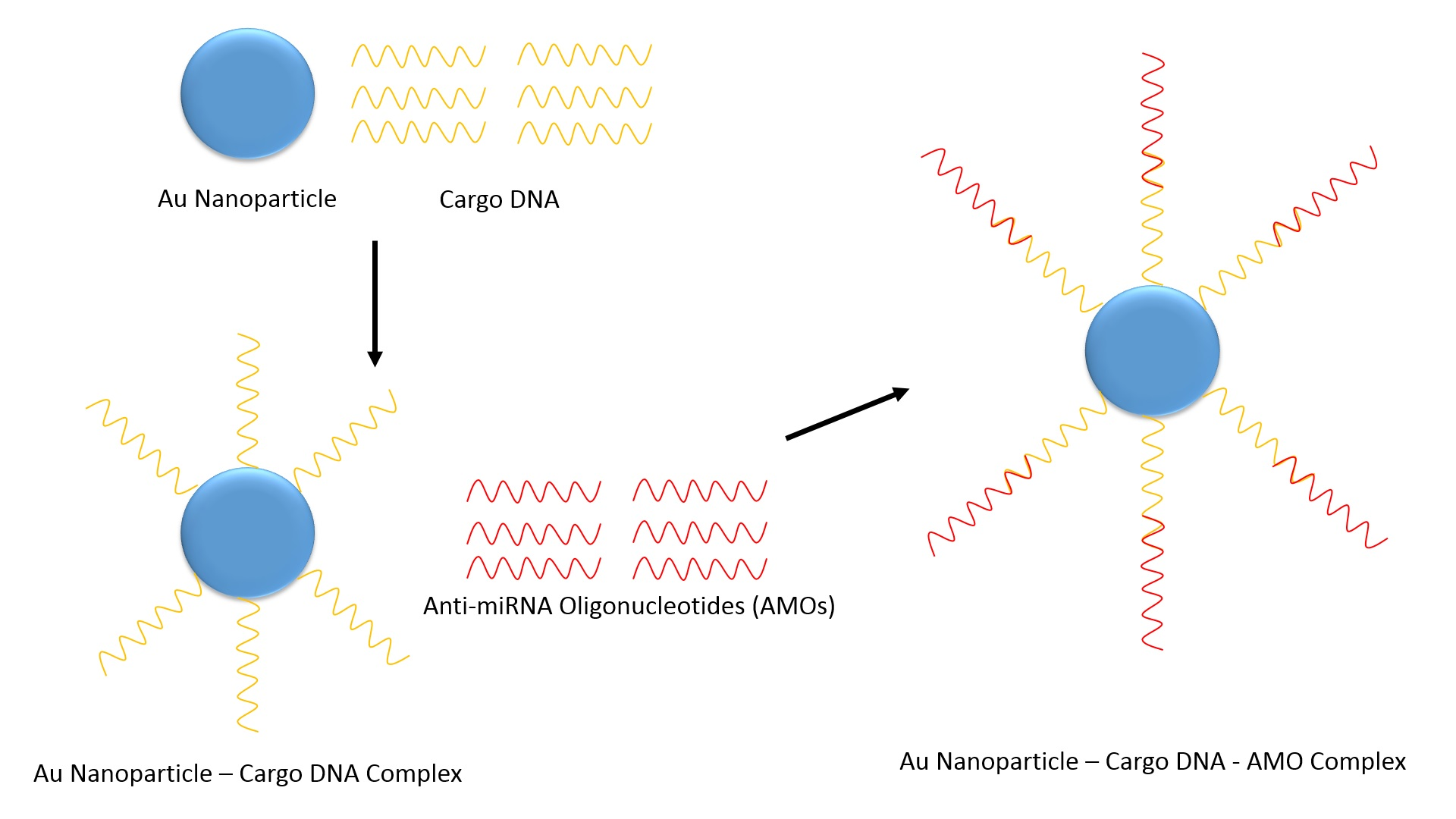
This figure depicts the method of using gold nanoparticles and cargo DNA to introduce AMOs into cells by in vitro transfection. Inspired by Figure 1.

Delivery of AMOs requires in vitro transfection into target cells. Presently there are difficulties with conventional methods of transfection that result in low delivery efficiency. In order to increase the effectiveness of AMO delivery, a 2011 paper proposed using functionalized gold nanoparticles. The gold nanoparticles increase delivery efficiency by conjugating with a cargo DNA that anneals to the AMO using complementarity. The cargo DNA is attached to the surface of the nanoparticle. Because many variations of DNA and RNA are unstable in in vivo conditions, carriers, such as nanoparticles, are necessary to protect from degeneration by nucleases. These nanoparticles are useful in order to facilitate uptake into the cell, and transfer the genetic information to the nucleus. Another in vivo method for delivery supported by results in mice is the injection of AMOs intravenously. Tail vein injection of AMOs in the mice were shown to be effective. In order for this system to be useful, the AMOs were conjugated with cholesterol for increased uptake into the cell through the membrane and were chemically modified by 2′-OMe phosphoramidites to prevent degradation of the AMOs.

To detect the presence and functionality of AMOs, researchers can observe the relative activity of the target enzyme or protein of the miRNA. This method was used in a study of single AMOs targeting multiple miRNAs, where relative luciferase activity in HEK293 cells was monitored. To determine relative Luciferase activity levels, a control with no miRNA present was included. The presence of functional AMOs with the inhibiting miRNA would result in an increase in Luciferase activity due to the inactivation of the miRNA suppressing the enzyme's activity.

== Disorders/Therapeutics ==
Many human disorders have been found to have some alterations in expression or aberrations involving miRNA. It has been found that miRNA have been involved in many key regulation pathways that are suspected to be related to cancer, viral genes, and metabolic pathways, as well as muscular disorders (specifically cardiovascularly related). By targeting cells affected with improper miRNA expression, the normal balance of the expression can be restored by using AMOs. By minimizing overexpression and increasing underexpression with AMOs, some of these genetic disorders can be potentially bypassed or at least have their symptoms minimized. This is done by hybridization of the AMOs to miRNA sequences that are involved in the expression of specific genes. The issue is finding a way for the AMOs to successfully perform their function in concentrations that are sufficient for success, while at the same time being low enough to avoid toxicity of the vector and AMOs themselves.

Antagomirs are used as a method to constitutively inhibit the activity of specific miRNAs associated with disease. For example, antagomirs against miR-21 have been successfully used to inhibit fibrosis of heart and lung.

=== Cancer ===
All cancers are mutations in the genomes that cause abnormal cell growth. Determining factors that contribute to or regulate this excessive growth can potentially lead to preventative, therapeutic treatments of cancer. For example, chronic lymphocytic leukemias illustrates a region of miRNAs (mir-15 and mir-16) are missing from the genome in the expression of this cancer. While in other cancers, such as Burkitt's lymphoma, expression of miRNA sequences are amplified. This leads to the suggestion that many miRNA have regulatory sequences involved in cancer. If those were to be better regulated, potentially through AMOs, perhaps the onset and progression of cancer could be regulated.

Following a study of 540 tumor samples of various cancer types, it was discovered that 15 miRNAs were upregulated and 12 were downregulated. From the study, it was concluded that these miRNA sequences had an effect on cell growth and apoptosis in the cell. AMOs play into the equation as this regulatory factor for the miRNAs involved in cancer. If bound to a single affected miRNA site, the effect appears to be minimal. However, by creating sequences of anti-miRNA Oligonucleotides to bind to all of these implicit miRNAs, there was increased cell death within the cancer cells. One study involving antagomirs, a different variation of anti-miRNA oligonucleotides, focused on reducing induced tumors in mice. After 2 weeks of treatment, tumor growth was inhibited and regression was shown in 30% of cases. This illustrates that AMOs can be used to successfully inhibit cancers through miRNAs. This inhibition is caused by a direct silencing interaction of the miRNAs that in turn bind on the mRNA sequences that create proteins in cancer cells, as well as increased control of cellular processes of cancer.

=== Muscular Development ===
In the development of tissues in embryos, miRNA can have a role in the upregulation or downregulation of specific muscular development. miRNA-1 plays a role in muscle differentiation between cardiac and skeletal muscle precursor cells. In development, if levels of precursor cells are not properly regulated, it can result in muscular hypoplasia. By creating AMOs for these known miRNAs involved in muscle generation, it is possible to track a miRNA's specific mechanisms throughout the process of muscle generation by essentially using the created AMO to turn off the miRNA. This halts the production of myogenin(the transcription factor involved in myogenesis). By then measuring the changes in myogenin compared to standard, non-inhibited myogenesis, a miRNA's function can be determined as either upregulating or downregulating the synthesis of myogenin. By further understanding how certain miRNA sequences control the development of muscle, AMOs can be utilized to promote normal production levels of myogenin in organisms that have been detected to contain genetic errors involving myogenesis.

AMOs can also be used to prevent apoptosis, or organ hypoplasia, of the heart in the presence of high concentrations of hydrogen peroxide. Hydrogen peroxide can induce apoptosis through oxidative stress. This is because oxidative stress caused by H_{2}O_{2} induces increased activity of miRNA-1. This increased miRNA-1 activity represses the activity of Bcl-2, inducing apoptosis. However, by creating and introducing an AMO for miRNA-1 in an environment of oxidative stress, the response to H_{2}O_{2} is reduced, creating a resistance to oxidative stress in the heart. Because of this, the amount of hydrogen peroxide-induced apoptosis of cardiomyocytes is reduced in heart disease. Due to the reduction of cardiomyocyte death in conditions of oxidative stress by the anti-miRNA-1 Oligonucleotide, miRNA regulation can allow us to more deeply understand the development of the heart, as well as the survival of heart muscle in low oxygen conditions.

=== Autoimmune Response and Disorders ===
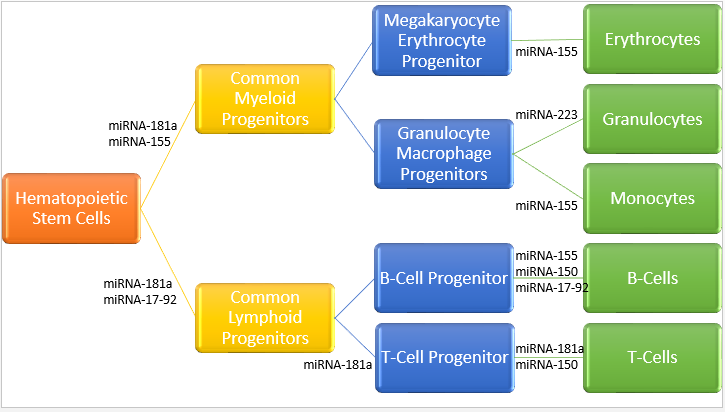
This diagram illustrates the various locations in the process of lymphocyte specificity that have miRNA regulation. Each of these sites has the potential to be over or under-expressed which can result in hyper/hypo-sensitivity of the immune system. Inspired by Figure 2

Autoimmune disorders are when the body has an immune response to itself, causing an inflammatory reaction to occur within the body. Because autoimmune disorders involve abnormalities in the immune system cells (i.e., B-cells, T-cells). It can be inferred that miRNA are strongly expressed in regions of the body that have to do with the maturation of these T and B lymphocytes, such as in the spleen and lymph nodes. Abnormalities in the miRNA or the function of the miRNA in the post-transcriptional process can result in an increased sensitivity of the lymphocytes. Due to increased sensitivity, these lymphocytes can now target antigens that it could not previously bind, which can allow for these lymphocytes to attack itself, if these antigens happen to naturally occur in cells in the body.

One instance of this is Rheumatoid Arthritis, in which the body breaks down its own joints. The breakdown is caused by the overexpression of specific miRNA clusters. These clusters causes an increase in synovial fibroblasts. Due to this increased fibroblast amount, certain proteases' concentrations are increased which cause the breakdown of cartilage in joints. By targeting the miRNA clusters responsible for expression of the disease, inflammation caused by this disorder can be reduced when AMOs are added to afflicted areas.

Systemic lupus erythematosus causes long term organ damage to the body. It propagates due to environmental and genetic factors. By targeting microRNA (miR-184, miR-196a, miR-198, and miR-21) that are down-regulated in SLE with AMOs in the affected organs, the normal expression of these genes can be restored.

=== Viral Studies ===
It is believed that cellular miRNAs inhibit viral gene expression. In a study of HIV-1, anti-miRNA inhibitors were used to deactivate two miRNAs that inhibit viral gene expression, has-miR-29a and 29b. It was shown that viral gene expression increased after the introduction of anti-miRNAs targeting has-miR-29a and 29b. This demonstrated miRNA inhibitors were able to directly target and reverse the inhibitory effect of has-miR-29a and 29b in the HIV-1 virus. By creating an AMO, certain genomic sequences of HIV were able to be studied more in depth. A further understanding of the way the genome of certain viruses work can allow scientists to create preventative measures against these viruses.

The mechanism for anti-miRNA regulation in the case of the Epstein-Barr virus (EBV) differs slightly than other viral cases such as HIV-1. EBV is a herpesvirus related to various cancers that has the ability to express miRNAs, unlike many other viruses that affect humans. Unlike other studies that utilize anti-miRNAs as a knockdown tool to demonstrate the effects of miRNAs, researchers of EBV used them to inhibit the miRNAs produced by the virus. MiR-BART5, a miRNA of EBV, regulates the protein: p53 Up-regulated Modulator of Apoptosis (PUMA). When the viral mir-BART5 was depleted using its anti-miRNA, anti-miR-BART5, cell apoptosis was triggered and resulted in disease control, killing the cells that are identified as infected.

Another peculiar case of host-viral interaction mediated by a microRNA occurs with the hepatitis C virus (HCV). HCV, which causes acute infection of the liver, often going undetected and progressing to chronic, uses the human miRNA miR-122 to recruit Argonaute2 proteins to the uncapped 5' end of its RNA genome, thereby masking it from the cellular antiviral response and stabilizing it. This interaction has led to the development of AMOs that target miR-122 in an effort to clear the virus from the hepatic cells. The most advanced of these compounds is miravirsen, a locked nucleic acid-DNA mixmer, currently undergoing clinical trials. An interesting aspect of miravirsen is its reported ability to inhibit not just the mature miR-122, but to also invade the stem-loop structures in the microRNA precursor molecules, disrupting the biogenesis of miR-122 in biochemical assays and cell culture.

==== HCV ====
The primary method for using microRNA technology to target the Hepatitis C Virus (HCV) is by knocking-out the liver-specific microRNA. miRNA-122 binds to the 5' untranslatedregion of HCV's mRNA strand and, contrary to miRNA's normal function of repressing mRNA, actually upregulates the expression of the Hepatitis C Virus. Thus, the therapeutic goal in such a case would be to keep miRNA-122 from binding to HCV mRNA in order to prevent this mRNA from being expressed. However, miRNA-122 also regulates cholesterol (HDL) and the activity of tumor-suppressor genes (oncogenes).This means that not only will knocking out the microRNA-122 reduce the HCV infection, but it will also reduce the activity of tumor suppressor genes, potentially leading to liver cancer. In order to target HCV mRNA specifically (instead of miRNA-122 as a whole), Blockmir technology has been developed to solely target HCV mRNA, thus avoiding any sort of tampering with oncogene expression. This may be achieved by designing a Blockmir that matches seed 1.

=== High-density lipoprotein ===
MicroRNA-33a/b inhibition in mice leads to increased blood high-density lipoprotein (HDL) levels. Abca1 is essential for production of HDL precursors in liver cells. In macrophages, Abca1 excretes cholesterol from oxidized cholesterol-carrying lipoproteins and thus counteracts atherosclerotic plaques. From this, it is hypothesized that microRNA-33 affects HDL via regulation of Abca1. Therefore, in order to target the regulation of Abca1, a blockmir can be developed that specifically binds to Abca1 mRNA molecules, thus blocking its miRNA site and upregulating its expression. Such an application of blockmir technology could lead to overall increased HDL levels.

=== Insulin signalling ===
MicroRNA-103/107 inhibition in mice leads to increased insulin sensitivity and signalling It has been previously shown that caveolin-1-deficient mice show insulin resistance. MicroRNA-103/107 inhibition in caveolin-1-deficient mice had no effect on insulin sensitivity and signalling. Thus, microRNA-103/107 may affect insulin sensitivity by targeting caveolin-1.

=== Ischemia and immunotherapy ===
The blockmir CD5-2 has been shown to inhibit the interaction between miR-27 and VE-cadherin, enhancing recovery from ischemic injury in mice. The drug has also been shown to enhance T cell infiltration in combination with immunotherapy in mouse models of pancreatic cancer.
