= Aladjem =

Aladjem is a surname. Notable people with the surname include:

- Mackenzie Aladjem (born 2001), American actress
- Mirit I. Aladjem, Israeli-American biologist

== See also ==
- Aladje
