= Mirit =

Mirit is a feminine given name. Notable people with the name include:

- Mirit I. Aladjem (fl. from 1999), Israeli-American biologist
- Mirit Cohen (1945–1990), Israeli artist
