= Phosphoramidite =

Monoamide of a phosphite diester

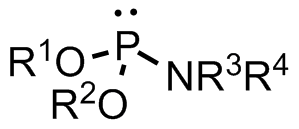
Phosphoramidite: general structure

A phosphoramidite (RO)_{2}PNR_{2} is a monoamide of a phosphite diester. The key feature of phosphoramidites is their markedly high reactivity towards nucleophiles catalyzed by weak acids e.c., triethylammonium chloride or 1H-tetrazole. In these reactions, the incoming nucleophile replaces the NR_{2} moiety.

== Applications ==
=== Nucleoside phosphoramidites ===
Phosphoramidites derived from protected nucleosides are referred to as nucleoside phosphoramidites and are widely used in chemical synthesis of DNA, RNA, and other nucleic acids and their analogs.

=== As ligands ===
Certain phosphoramidites are also used as monodentate chiral ligands in asymmetric synthesis. A large group of such ligands is derived from the chiral diol BINOL and can be synthesised by reaction of BINOL with phosphorus trichloride to the chlorophosphite and then reaction with simple secondary amines. This type of ligand was first used in 1996 in an asymmetric copper-catalysed addition of dialkylzincs to enones.

== See also ==
- Phosphoramidate
