= Oligosynthesis =

Oligosynthesis may refer to:

- Oligosynthetic language, a theoretical linguistic concept
- Oligonucleotide synthesis, chemical synthesis of short chains of DNA or RNA
