= BNA =

BNA may refer to:

== Media and entertainment ==
- Bahrain News Agency, the state news agency of Bahrain
- Bakhtar News Agency, the state news agency of Afghanistan
- Belga News Agency, the national news agency of Belgium
- British Newspaper Archive
- BNA: Brand New Animal, an anime television series
- BNA Records, a record label
- Bureau of National Affairs, a U.S. commercial publisher

== Travel ==
- BNA, IATA airport code of Nashville International Airport
- BNA, National Rail station code of Burnage railway station, Manchester, England

== Banks ==
- Banco Nacional de Angola
- Banco de la Nación Argentina

== Science ==
- British Naturalists' Association
- British Neuroscience Association
- Basle Nomina Anatomica, the first revision of anatomic nomenclature
- Bridged nucleic acid

== Canada ==
- British North America, a former name for Canada
- British North America Acts, the original Constitutional Acts of Canada

== Other ==
- Burma National Army
- Bulgarian National Alliance
