= Santaris Pharma =

Biopharmaceutical company founded in Denmark

Santaris Pharma A/S
- Industry: Biopharmacy; Pharmaceuticals
- Founded: 2003
- Fate: Acquired by Roche Pharmaceuticals
- Headquarters: Copenhagen, Denmark
- Products: RNA-targeted medicines, Locked nucleic acid (LNA) based drugs

Santaris Pharma A/S was a biopharmaceutical company founded in 2003 in Copenhagen, Denmark. The company also had a branch in San Diego, California that opened in 2009. Created by a merger between Cureon and Pantheco, Santaris developed RNA-targeted medicines using a Locked Nucleic Acid (LNA) Drug Platform and Drug Development Engine.

Santaris had gained intellectual property rights to the therapeutic applications of locked nucleic acid (LNA) technology. These rights included ownership of several patents, mostly with the chemistry and manufacturing of therapeutic drugs. With its LNA technology, Santaris developed drugs for the treatment of cancers and tumours using microRNA and mRNA. Its research focused on infectious diseases and metabolic disorders. The company also worked on collaborations with other pharmaceutical companies to develop drugs that could treat cancers and rare genetic disorders, among other things.

In August 2014, Santaris was acquired by Roche for $450 million. As a result, the Copenhagen site was renamed the Roche Innovation Center Copenhagen (RICC). RICC houses Roche's RNA Molecule Research, which is part of Roche Pharma Research and Early Development. In 2023, it was closed due to a decision to move research to Basel, Switzerland where Roche is headquartered. The former employees of the RICC were offered new jobs at the Danish pharmaceutical company Novo Nordisk.

== Locked Nucleic Acid (LNA) drug platform ==
Santaris developed LNA-based drugs to identify and design drug candidates. LNA is a modification of RNA, containing an oxymethylene bridge between the 2’ oxygen and 4’ carbon in the ribose ring. This bridge forms a bi-cyclic structure that locks the ribose conformation and is integral to the high stability and affinity of the LNA to its complementary RNA sequence. Santaris designed LNA oligonucleotides as antisense therapeutics to complement specific mRNA and microRNA sequences. Binding of the oligonucleotide to the target creates a stretch of dsRNA, which prevents translation. LNA oligonucleotides are shorter than other antisense drugs, which allows them a higher target affinity and potency than regular RNA oligonucleotides. LNA drugs are novel therapeutic agents because of their resistance to endonuclease activity. They do not need complicated drug delivery vehicles, their manufacturing is scalable and cost-effective, they are well tolerated, and there is potential for oral delivery.

== Drug candidates ==
=== Cancer drug candidates ===
In 2009, Santaris announced that two LNA based drugs EZN-3042, and EZN-2968 would be entering clinical trials. EZN-2968 is an inhibitor of a transcription factor, specifically HIF-1 alpha, which is involved in cells ability to undergo angiogenesis and other processes needed for cell survival. EZN-3042 is also an inhibitor, which acts against Survivin. Santaris partnered with Enzon Pharmaceuticals, for the development of both drug candidates.

=== Hyperlipidemia ===
SPC-4955 was a drug intended for the treatment of high cholesterol. SPC-4955 inhibits the protein that is necessary for the formation of plasma LDL cholesterol particles. This has the potential to be used as a treatment for patients with hyperlipidemia. SPC-5001 which targets PCSK9 program also has the potential to treat patients with hyperlipidemia. It inhibits the protein that controls the number of receptors responsible for removing LDL cholesterol particles from the blood.

As of 2022, clinical trials on SPC-4955 have been discontinued by Roche.

=== Hepatitis C ===
Santaris developed a microRNA targeting drug for hepatitis C (HCV), miravirsen (SPC3649), which entered Phase II clinical trials in 2010. The drug targets miR-122, a host factor necessary for viral replication of the hepatitis C virus in host liver cells; because miravirsen targets a host factor rather than the virus itself, there are no indications of the virus developing resistance. The U.S. Food and Drug Administration approved a multiple dosing study, by injection, to treatment-naive patients for phase II testing.

=== Rare genetic disorders ===
Santaris had a collaboration with Shire to discover and develop new RNA-based medicines to treat rare genetic disorders.

== Collaborations ==
Santaris partnered with several pharmaceutical companies that wanted to develop LNA oligonucleotides for mRNA and microRNA targets. Pfizer and Santaris entered a collaboration pact in 2009, which was expanded in 2011. It also had a partnership with Enzon for cancer drug targets,Shire for lead candidates of five rare, undisclosed genetic disorders, miRagen to develop treatments targeting microRNAs associated with cardiovascular disease, and GlaxoSmithKline for RNA-targeted medication.

== Timeline ==
- 2003: Santaris was founded through a merger of Cureon and Pantheco.
- 2004: Began cancer drug development – LNA-based drugs SPC3042 targeting Survivin and SPC2968 targeting HIF-1alpha.
- 2005: Began a miRNA research and drug development program.
- 2006: Partnership with Enzon for cancer therapeutics.
- 2007: Commencement of preclinical development of SPC3649, a microRNA-targeted drug for the treatment of Hepatitis C. Established commercial partnership with GlaxoSmithKline for global research and development and of up four programs in viral diseases. Enzon files IND and completes two Phase I/II US studies of advanced cancer research with EZN-2968.
- 2008: Biotech grant of 45 million DKK, $9.33 million, from Danish Advanced Technology for microRNA antagonist research. Santaris Pharma named one of the “Fierce 15” Biotech Companies of 2008 by FierceBiotech. Advanced to Phase 1 clinical trials for the treatment of HCV using a microRNA-targeted drug, SPC3649. Study published in Nature that shows LNA-based drugs targeting microRNAs capacity in non-human primates.
- 2009: Establishment of a branch in San Diego, California, United States of America. Formed collaboration with Shire to develop RNA-based medicines for the treatment of rare genetic disorders. Advanced the 4955 into drug development, which is a compound that targets Apolipoprotein B and could decrease and manage high cholesterol into drug development. Publication in Science showing how the breakthrough microRNA-targeted therapy SPC3649 is a promising new treatment for Hepatitis C. Wyeth Pharmaceuticals and Santaris Pharma announce their partnership to develop RNA-targeted medicines.
- 2010: Santaris Pharma A/S and miRagen Therapeutics form a partnership to develop microRNA-targeted medicines for the treatment of cardiovascular disease. Advanced SPC5001, which targets PCSK9, into drug development for the treatment of high cholesterol. Received the Red Herring Top 100 Europe Award.
- 2011: Obtained license from Massachusetts General Hospital for intellectual property related to miR-33 regulations for cardiovascular disorder treatment. Expanded collaborations with Pfizer Inc. directed on development of RNA-targeted medicines. Advancement of miravirsen to Phase II trials, which is the first microRNA-targeted drug to enter clinical trials, and aims to treat patients infected with Hepatitis C.
- 2013: Santaris Pharma A/S and Bristol-Myers Squibb form a partnership to develop new medicines targeting mRNAs and microRNAs through Santaris' LNA technology. Santaris Pharma A/S and RaNa Therapeutics form an alliance to develop medicines against up to ten of RaNA's proprietary RNA targets, in a treatment that actively selects their protein expression.
- 2014: Santaris Pharma A/S and GlaxoSmithKline (GSK) sign an agreement, wherein GSK gains access to LNA technology for medicine development.
- 2014: Santaris Pharma A/S was acquired by Roche and renamed the Roche Innovation Center Copenhagen.

== Awards ==
- 2008: Fierce 15 by Fierce Biotechnology.
- 2010: Red Herring Top 100 Europe Award.

== Litigation ==
- Santaris Pharma A/S vs. Exiqon A/S

In 2010, Exiqon completed its litigation against Santaris for the supply of LNA. The court determined that both companies may supply the product for research and development of pharmaceutical products. Exiqon was made to pay partial costs to Santaris of DKK 2 million within two weeks.

- Santaris Pharma A/S vs. Isis Pharmaceuticals

Isis Pharmaceuticals filed a patent infringement lawsuit against Santaris Pharma A/S in the United States District Court for the Southern District of California in September 2011. Isis's infringement suit against Santaris is based upon Santaris's activities providing antisense drugs and antisense drug discovery services to several pharmaceutical companies.
