= Dimethoxytrityl =

Names
- IUPAC name bis(4-methoxyphenyl)-phenylmethyl radical
- Other names: 4,4'-Benzylidenedianisole; 4,4'-Dimethoxytrityl cation; 4,4'-Dimethoxytriphenylmethyl radical; Bis(p-methoxyphenyl)phenylmethyl radical; DMT

Identifiers
CAS Number	-H: 7500-76-7
3D model (JSmol)	-H: Interactive image; +: Interactive image
ChemSpider	-H: 74017; +: 9080474
EC Number	-H: 231-356-7
PubChem CID	-H: 82012; +: 10905215
UNII	-H: FAN78ASF8G
- InChI: -H: InChI=1S/C21H20O2/c1-22-19-12-8-17(9-13-19)21(16-6-4-3-5-7-16)18-10-14-20(23-2)15-11-18/h3-15,21H,1-2H3 Key: RIRAVPPUGSNYOU-UHFFFAOYSA-N; +: InChI=1S/C21H19O2/c1-22-19-12-8-17(9-13-19)21(16-6-4-3-5-7-16)18-10-14-20(23-2)15-11-18/h3-15H,1-2H3/q+1 Key: JLRBVXBVFZQEHA-UHFFFAOYSA-N
- SMILES: -H: COC1=CC=C(C=C1)C(C2=CC=CC=C2)C3=CC=C(C=C3)OC; +: COC1=CC=C(C=C1)C(=C2C=CC(=[O+]C)C=C2)C3=CC=CC=C3

Properties
Chemical formula	C21H19O2
Molar mass	303.4
- Except where otherwise noted, data are given for materials in their standard state (at 25 °C [77 °F], 100 kPa). Infobox references

Dimethoxytrityl, often abbreviated DMT, is a protecting group widely used for protection of the 5'-hydroxy group in nucleosides, particularly in oligonucleotide synthesis.

It is usually bound to a molecule, but can exist as a stable cation in solution, where it appears bright orange.
