= Depurination =

Chemical reaction in genetics

Depurination is a chemical reaction of purine deoxyribonucleosides, deoxyadenosine and deoxyguanosine, and ribonucleosides, adenosine or guanosine, in which the β-N-glycosidic bond is hydrolytically cleaved releasing a nucleic base, adenine or guanine, respectively. The second product of depurination of deoxyribonucleosides and ribonucleosides is sugar, 2'-deoxyribose and ribose, respectively. More complex compounds containing nucleoside residues, nucleotides and nucleic acids, also suffer from depurination. Deoxyribonucleosides and their derivatives are substantially more prone to depurination than their corresponding ribonucleoside counterparts. Loss of pyrimidine bases (cytosine and thymine) occurs by a similar mechanism, but at a substantially lower rate.

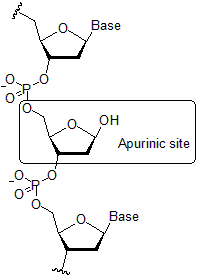
Figure. 1. Chemical structure of apurinic site present in a fragment of single-stranded DNA.

When depurination occurs with DNA, it leads to the formation of apurinic site and results in an alteration of the structure. Studies estimate that as many as 5,000 purines are lost this way each day in a typical human cell. In cells, one of the main causes of depurination is the presence of endogenous metabolites undergoing chemical reactions. Apurinic sites in double-stranded DNA are efficiently repaired by portions of the base excision repair (BER) pathway. Depurinated bases in single-stranded DNA undergoing replication can lead to mutations, because in the absence of information from the complementary strand, BER can add an incorrect base at the apurinic site, resulting in either a transition or transversion mutation.

Depurination is known to play a major role in cancer initiation.

Hydrolytic depurination is one of the principal forms of damage to ancient DNA in fossil or subfossil material, since the base remains unrepaired. This results in both loss of information (the base sequence), and difficulties in recovery and in vitro replication of the damaged molecule by the polymerase chain reaction.

== Chemistry of the reaction ==
Depurination is not uncommon because purine is a good leaving group via the 9N-nitrogen (see the structure of a purine). Furthermore, the anomeric carbon is especially reactive towards nucleophilic substitution (effectively making the carbon-oxygen bond shorter, stronger and more polar, while making the carbon-purine bond longer and weaker). This makes the bond especially susceptible to hydrolysis.

In chemical synthesis of oligonucleotides, depurination is one of the major factors limiting the length of synthetic oligonucleotides.
