= Bridged nucleic acid =

A bridged nucleic acid (BNA) is a class of modified RNA nucleotides. They are sometimes also referred to as constrained or inaccessible RNA molecules. BNA monomers can contain a five-membered, six-membered or even a seven-membered bridged structure with a "fixed" C_{3}'-endo sugar puckering. The bridge is synthetically incorporated at the 2', 4'-position of the ribose to afford a 2', 4'-BNA monomer. The monomers can be incorporated into oligonucleotide polymeric structures using standard phosphoramidite chemistry. BNAs are structurally rigid oligo-nucleotides with increased binding affinities and stability.

== Chemical structures ==
Chemical structures of BNA monomers containing a bridge at the 2', 4'-position of the ribose to afford a 2', 4'-BNA monomer as synthesized by Takeshi Imanishi's group. The nature of the bridge can vary for different types of monomers. The 3D structures for A-RNA and B-DNA were used as a template for the design of the BNA monomers. The goal for the design was to find derivatives that possess high binding affinities with complementary RNA and/or DNA strands.

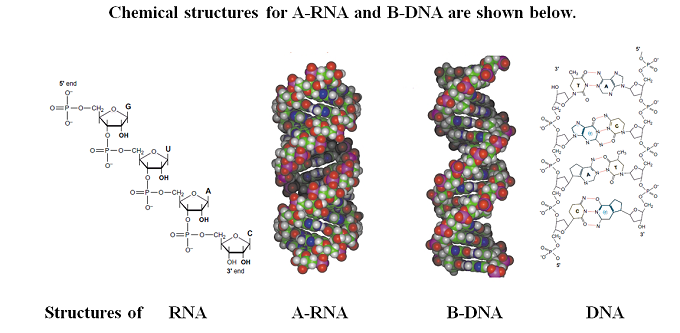
The 3D structures for A-RNA and B-DNA

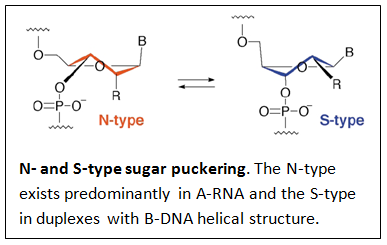

An increased conformational inflexibility of the sugar moiety in nucleosides (oligonucleotides) results in a gain of high binding affinity with complementary single-stranded RNA and/or double-stranded DNA. The first 2',4'-BNA (known as locked nucleic acid) monomers were first synthesized by Takeshi Imanishi's group in 1997 followed independently by Jesper Wengel's group in 1998.

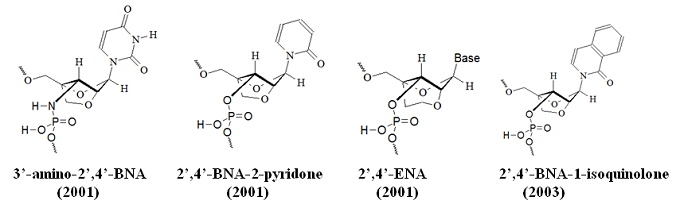
Chemical structures of other BNAs that were synthesized in the past years as indicated below the structures.

BNA nucleotides can be incorporated into DNA or RNA oligonucleotides at any desired position. Such oligomers are synthesized chemically and are now commercially available. The bridged ribose conformation enhances base stacking and pre-organizes the backbone of the oligonucleotide significantly increasing their hybridization properties.

The incorporation of BNAs into oligonucleotides allows the production of modified synthetic oligonucleotides with equal or higher binding affinity against a DNA or RNA complement with excellent single-mismatch discriminating power; better RNA selective binding; stronger and more sequence selective triplex-forming characters; pronounced higher nuclease resistance, even higher than Sp-phosphorothioate analogues; and good aqueous solubility of the resulting oligonucleotides when compared to regular DNA or RNA oligonucleotides.

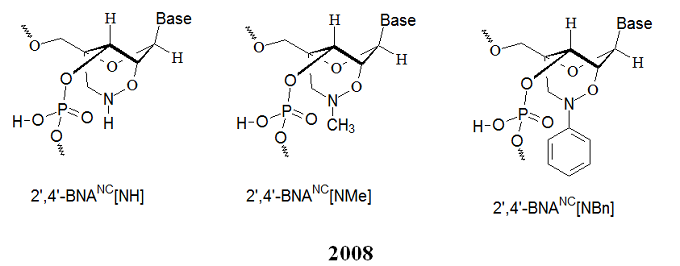
Chemical structures of BNAs were introduced in 2007 by Imanishi's group. These new generation of BNAs analogues are called 2',4'-BNA^{NC}[NH], 2',4'-BNA^{NC}[NMe], and 2',4'-BNA^{NC}[NBn].

New BNA analogs introduced by Imanishi's group were designed by taking the length of the bridged moiety into account. A six-membered bridged structure with a unique structural feature (N-O bond) in the sugar moiety was designed to have a nitrogen atom. This atom improves the formation of duplexes and triplexes by lowering the repulsion between the negatively charged backbone phosphates. These modifications allow to control the affinity towards complementary strands, regulate resistance against nuclease degradation and the synthesis of functional molecules designed for specific applications in genomics. The properties of these analogs were investigated and compared to those of previous 2',4'-BNA (LNA) modified oligonucleotides by Imanishi's group. Imanishi's results show that "2',4'-BNA^{NC}-modified oligonucleotides with these profiles show great promise for applications in antisense and antigene technologies."

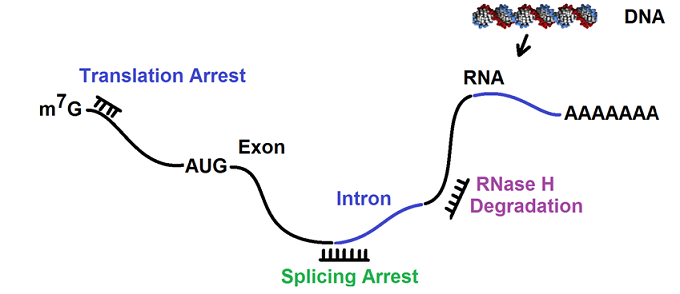
Makoto Koizumi in 2004 reviewed the properties of BNAs with focus on ENAs as antisense and antigen oligonucleotides (AONs) and proposed an action mechanism for these compounds that may involve translation arrest, mRNA degradation mediated by RNase H and splicing arrest.

== Proposed mechanism of action of AONs ==
Yamamoto et al. in 2012 demonstrated that BNA-based antisense therapeutics inhibited hepatic PCSK9 expression, resulting in a strong reduction of the serum LDL-C levels of mice. The findings supported the hypothesis that PCSK9 is a potential therapeutic target for hypercholesterolemia and the researchers were able to show that BNA-based antisense oligonucleotides (AONs) induced cholesterol-lowering action in hypercholesterolemic mice. A moderate increase of aspartate aminotransferase, ALT, and blood urea nitrogen levels was observed whereas the histopathological analysis revealed no severe hepatic toxicities. The same group, also in 2012, reported that the 2',4'-BNA^{NC}[NMe] analog when used in antisense oligonucleotides showed significantly stronger inhibitory activities which is more pronounced in shorter (13- to 16mer) oligonucleotides. Their data led the researchers to conclude that the 2',4'-BNA^{NC}[NMe] analog may be a better alternative to conventional LNAs.

== Benefits of the BNA technology ==
Some of the benefits of BNAs include ideal for the detection of short RNA and DNA targets; increase the thermal stability of duplexes; capable of single nucleotide discrimination; increases the thermal stability of triplexes; resistance to exo- and endonucleases resulting in a high stability for in vivo and in vitro applications; increased target specificity; facilitate Tm normalization; strand invasion enables detection of "hard to access" samples; compatible with standard enzymatic processes.

== Application of the BNA technology ==
Application of BNAs include small RNA research; design and synthesis of RNA aptamers; siRNA; antisense probes; diagnostics; isolation; microarray analysis; Northern blotting; real-time PCR; in situ hybridization; functional analysis; SNP detection and use as antigens and many others nucleotide base applications.

== See also ==
- Bridge RNA
