= MiR-122 =

mir-122 microRNA precursor
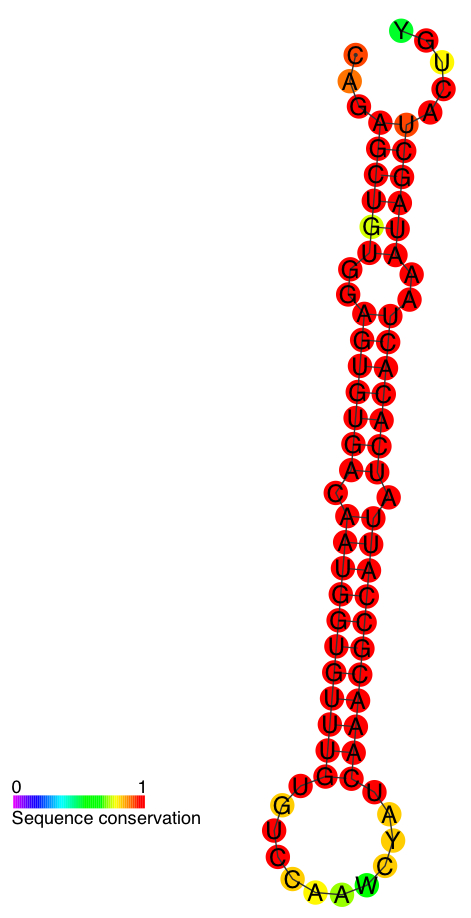
- Predicted secondary structure and sequence conservation of mir-122

Identifiers
- Symbol: mir-122
- Rfam: RF00684
- miRBase: MI0000442
- miRBase family: MIPF0000095

Other data
- RNA type: Gene; miRNA
- Domain: Eukaryota
- GO: GO:0035195
- SO: SO:0001244
- PDB structures: PDBe

miR-122 is a miRNA that is conserved among vertebrate species. miR-122 is not present in invertebrates, and no close paralogs of miR-122 have been detected. miR-122 is highly expressed in the liver, where it has been implicated as a regulator of fatty-acid metabolism in mouse studies. Reduced miR-122 levels are associated with hepatocellular carcinoma. miR-122 also plays an important positive role in the regulation of hepatitis C virus replication.

== Expression and regulation ==
miR-122 was originally identified by cloning of tissue-specific microRNAs in mouse. The liver-specific expression of miR-122 is conserved in zebrafish. miR-122 expression increases during embryogenesis until it constitutes 72% of total miRNA in adult human liver, making it one of the most highly expressed miRNAs in any tissue. In humans, miR-122 is encoded at a single genomic locus in chromosome 18. The primary miR-122 transcript (pri-miR-122) is a long non-coding RNA. Transcription is regulated by HNF4α. The miR-122 hairpin precursor consensus shown here is predicted based on base pairing and cross-species conservation. The mature sequence is excised from the 5' arm of the hairpin.

There is evidence that miR-122 is regulated by Rev-ErbA alpha which is involved in circadian gene expression, suggesting that miR-122 is a circadian metabolic regulator. miR-122 regulates the expression of several mRNA molecules that are important in the circadian cycle, such as PPARβ/δ. Mature miR-122 is subject to modification by the poly(A) polymerase GLD-2, which adds a single adenosine to the miRNA 3' end. This results in an increase in miR-122 stability.

== Targets ==
miR-122 regulates the synthesis of the protein CAT-1 by binding to sites in the mRNA 3'UTR such that translation is repressed and the mRNA is targeted to P bodies. This repression can be relieved by the protein HuR, which is released from the nucleus under conditions of cell stress and binds to the CAT-1 3'UTR. The HuR interaction leads to release of the mRNA from the P bodies and resumption of active translation.

A number of other miR-122 targets, including CD320, AldoA and BCKDK, have been identified by microarray analysis of changes in mRNA expression in the liver of mice treated with miR-122 inhibitors. The overall effect of miR-122 inhibition is to reduce the plasma cholesterol level, although the pathways involved in this regulation have not been fully elucidated. miR-122 also regulates systemic iron homeostasis via the target mRNAs Hjv and Hfe. miR-122 inhibition in mice or primates does not result in any detectable liver toxicity.

== Role in cancer ==
miR-122 levels are frequently reduced in hepatocellular carcinoma (HCC) compared to normal liver, and low miR-122 levels correlate with poor prognosis. Overexpression of miR-122 reduces tumorigenic properties in HCC cell lines, suggesting that it functions as a tumor suppressor gene, and increases the response of cells to the chemotherapeutic drugs sorafenib and doxorubicin. Several miR-122 target genes have been implicated in tumorigenesis, including ADAM10, IGF1R, CCNG1 and ADAM17.

== Innate Immunity ==
Recent studies demonstrated that miR-122 may directly regulate different aspects of the interferons (IFNs) signaling pathway to enhanced induction of anti-viral genes and inhibition of various virus. Moreover, miR-122 have been shown to target various genes, resulting in enhancement of IFN signaling and subsequent antiviral innate immunity. Interferons (IFNs, includes type I and III interferon) treatment leads to a significant reduction in the expression of the liver-specific miR-122. HepG2 cells with overexpressed microRNA-122 mount an effective antiviral interferon response and innate immune response to hepatitis C virus (HCV), other RNA viruses and viral mimetics (e.g. poly(I:C)).

== Regulation of HCV ==
Recent studies have shown that replication of hepatitis C virus (HCV) is dependent on miR-122 expression. miR-122 regulates HCV by binding directly to two adjacent sites close to the 5' end of HCV RNA. Although these experiments were conducted using genotype 1a and 1b HCV RNA, the miR-122 binding sites are highly conserved across different genotypes, and miR-122 is also required for replication of infectious type 2a HCV. As miRNAs generally function to repress gene expression by binding to 3'UTR sites, this positive regulation of viral replication via a 5'UTR represents a novel function for miR-122. The mechanism of regulation is not yet clear. miR-122 stimulates translation of HCV RNA, but not to a sufficient extent to explain its effects on viral replication, indicating that a second stage of the viral replication cycle must also be regulated. HCV RNA synthesis is not affected by miR-122, suggesting that regulation of other processes such as RNA stability may occur. The extent to which the miRNA-induced silencing complex (miRISC) is involved in this regulation has not been fully determined. The Argonaute proteins (Ago1–4), which are essential for miRNA-directed repression, appear to be necessary for miR-122 to regulate HCV, although miR-122 overexpression may overcome this requirement. The crystal structure of Ago2:miR-122 bound to the miR-122 binding site at the 5'-end of the HCV genome, in combination with functional experiments, suggests that the viral RNA has evolved to maximize protection from cytoplasmic exoribonucleases by altering the molecular behavior of Ago2. Another miRISC component, the DEAD-box RNA helicase DDX6, does not play a role in miR-122-facilitated HCV replication.

The existing HCV therapy of PEG-IFNα plus ribavirin is poorly tolerated and frequently ineffective, so there is an urgent need for new drugs, and miR-122 inhibitors are an attractive possibility. The association between low miR-122 levels and hepatocellular carcinoma suggests that caution will be necessary when testing miR-122 inhibitors, and that long-term treatment might be undesirable. However, miR-122 is a promising target as it can be very selectively and effectively inhibited with antisense oligonucleotides, and as it is a conserved host factor it is hoped that the virus would not be able to acquire resistance mutations to an anti-miR-122 therapeutic. Moreover, engineering HepG2 cells to express miR-122 (HepG2-HFL cell, HepG2 cells expressing miR-122) mount an effective antiviral interferon-lambda (IFNλ) based innate immune response to hepatitis C virus (HCV) infection. HepG2 cells (stably expressing miR-122) produced a more robust IFN Response (type I and type III interferons) when challenged with other RNA viruses [ IAV-ΔNS1 and SeV ] and viral mimetics than Huh-7 and Huh-7.5 cells. HCV Induces an IFN-λ (IL28 and IL29), ISG, and Cytokine Response in these HepG2 cells with stably expressing miR-122.

=== Inhibitor miravirsen ===
As of 2017, Santaris Pharma was developing miravirsen, a locked nucleic acid-based antisense oligonucleotide that inhibits miR-122, as a potential treatment for HepC.

== Use as a biomarker ==
miR-122 has recently been explored as a potential biomarker for various hepatic conditions. A change in levels of miR-122 in the blood has been confirmed as an indicator for viral-, alcohol- and chemical-induced liver injury as well as Transplant rejection after Liver transplantation. This change is noted before increased amino-transferase activity, making it an early indicator of liver disease and hepatocellular injury of liver grafts prior to liver transplantation.

There is a great deal of research into the use of miR-122 as a biomarker for hepatitis C. While some studies dispute its efficacy for diagnosing Hep C, other research indicates that it may be useful in diagnosing specific forms of hepatitis. In addition, decreased levels of miR-122 in liver biopsies have been linked to a strain of hepatitis C that is resistant to interferon therapy.

miR-122 has also been suggested as a biomarker for hepatectomy-induced liver injury in patients with hepatocellular carcinoma.

Detection of miR-122 and other microRNAs in Body fluid like blood can be interfered by heparin contaminated. The commonly used anticoagulant heparin profoundly inhibits the by reverse transcription polymerase chain reaction (RT-PCR) used for microRNA quantification.
