= AP site =

Biochemical site of damaged DNA or RNA

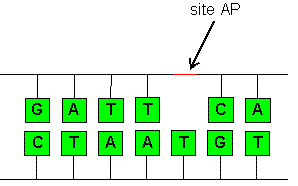
Simple representation of an AP site.

In biochemistry and molecular genetics, an AP site (apurinic/apyrimidinic site), also known as an abasic site, is a location in DNA (also in RNA but much less likely) that has neither a purine nor a pyrimidine base, either spontaneously or due to DNA damage. It has been estimated that under physiological conditions 10,000 apurinic sites and 500 apyrimidinic may be generated in a cell daily.

AP sites can be formed by spontaneous depurination, but also occur as intermediates in base excision repair. In this process, a DNA glycosylase recognizes a damaged base and cleaves the N-glycosidic bond to release the base, leaving an AP site. A variety of glycosylases that recognize different types of damage exist, including oxidized or methylated bases, or uracil in DNA. The AP site can then be cleaved by an AP endonuclease, leaving 3'-hydroxyl and deoxyribose-5-phosphate termini (see DNA structure). In alternative fashion, bifunctional glycosylase-lyases can cleave the AP site, leaving a 5' phosphate adjacent to a 3' α,β-unsaturated aldehyde. Both mechanisms form a single-strand break, which is then repaired by either short-patch or long-patch base excision repair.

If left unrepaired, AP sites can lead to mutation during semiconservative replication. They can cause replication fork stalling and are bypassed by translesion synthesis. In E. coli, adenine is preferentially inserted across from AP sites, known as the "A rule". The situation is more complex in higher eukaryotes, with different nucleotides showing a preference depending on the organism and experimental conditions.

== Formation ==
AP sites form when deoxyribose is cleaved from its nitrogenous base, breaking the glycosidic linkage between the two. This can happen spontaneously, as a result of chemical activity, radiation, or due to enzyme activity. The glycosidic linkages in DNA can be broken via acid-catalyzed hydrolysis. Purine bases can be ejected under weakly acidic conditions, while pyrimidines require stronger acidity in order to be cleaved. Purines may even be removed at neutral pH, if temperature increases sufficiently. AP site formation can also be caused by various base-modifying chemicals. Alkylation, deamination, and oxidation of individual bases can all lead to the weakening of the glycosyl bond, so exposure to agents that cause those modifications can encourage AP site formation.

Ionizing radiation can also lead to AP site formation. Irradiated environments contain radicals, which can contribute to AP sites in multiple ways. Hydroxyl radicals can attack the glycosidic linkages, directly creating an AP site, or make the glycosyl bond less favorable by linking to the base or the deoxyribose ring.

Enzymes, namely DNA glycosylases, also commonly create AP sites, as part of the base excision repair pathway. In a given mammalian cell, 5000–10,000 apurinic sites are estimated to form per day. Apyrimidinic sites form at a rate roughly 20 times slower, with estimates at around 500 formation events per day, per cell. At rates this high, it is critical for cells to have a robust repair apparatus in place in order to prevent mutation.

== Characteristics ==
=== Chemical characteristics ===
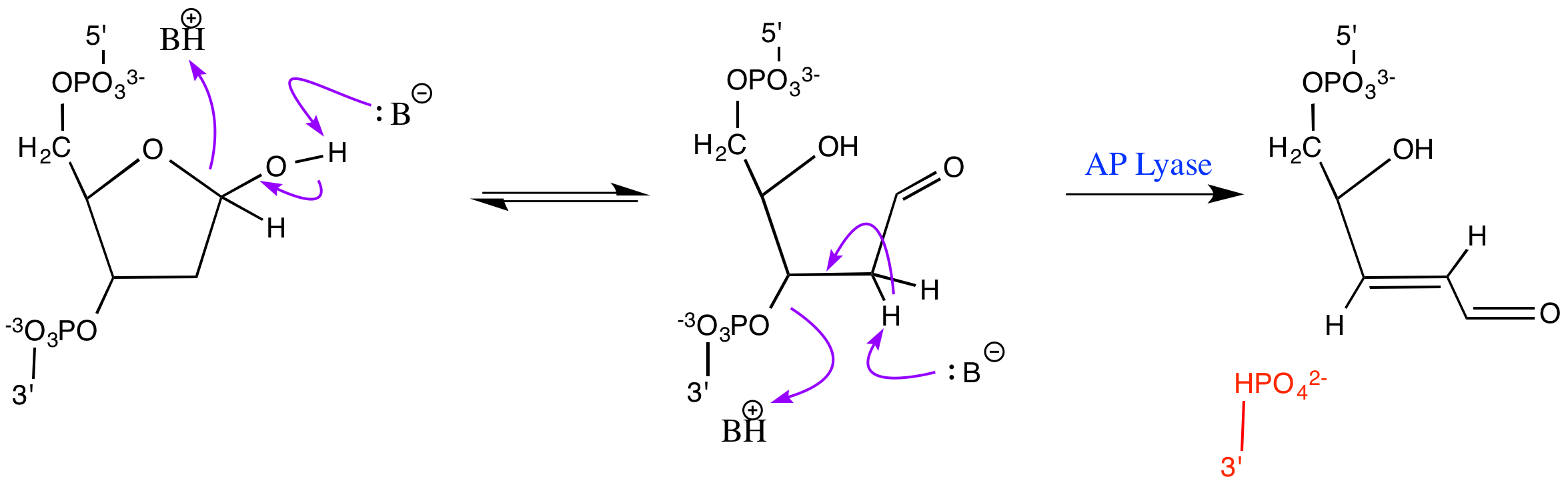
AP site reactivity

AP sites are extremely reactive. They fluctuate between a furanose ring and an open-chain free aldehyde and free alcohol conformation. Exposure to a nucleophile can cause a β-elimination reaction, wherein the 3' phosphoester bond is broken, causing a single-stranded break. This reaction can be catalyzed by AP lyase. In the presence of excess reagent, an additional elimination can occur on the 5' side. The free aldehyde can also react with nucleophilic, amine-containing aldehydes. These reactions can further promote phosphoester bond cleavage. Aldehydes containing O-HN_{2} groups can serve to stabilize the abasic site by reacting with the aldehyde group. This interaction does not cleave the phosphoester bond.

=== Biological activity ===
AP sites in living cells can cause various and severe consequences, including cell death. The single-stranded breaks occurring due to β-elimination require repair by DNA ligase in order to avoid mutation. When DNA polymerase encounters an abasic site, DNA replication is usually blocked, which may itself lead to a single-stranded or double-stranded break in the DNA helix. In E. coli, when the enzyme manages to bypass the abasic site, an adenine is preferentially incorporated into the new strand. If AP sites in DNA are not repaired, DNA replication cannot proceed normally, and significant mutations can result. If mutations are merely single nucleotide polymorphisms, then the cell can potentially be unaffected. However, if more serious mutations occur, cell function can be severely impaired, growth and division may be impaired, or the cell may simply die.

== Repair ==
AP sites are an important feature of the base excision repair pathway. DNA glycosylases first create abasic sites by recognizing and removing modified bases. Many glycosylase variants exist to deal with the multiple ways a base can be damaged. The most common circumstances are base alkylation, oxidation, and the presence of a uracil in the DNA strand. Once an AP site has been successful created, an AP endonuclease catalyzes the breakage of one phosphoester bond, creating a nick in the backbone of the helix. The breakage can be either 3' or 5' of the site, depending on the variant of the enzyme. End processing enzymes then prepare the site for nick ligation, which is performed by DNA polymerase. The base inserted into the nick is determined by the corresponding base on the opposite strand. The nick is then sealed by DNA ligase.

The activity of AP endonuclease in the repair of AP sites in the frontal/parietal cortex, cerebellum, brain stem, midbrain and hypothalamus declines with age in rats on an ad libitum diet. In calorie restricted rats, by comparison, AP endonuclease activity in these brain regions remains higher with age. These findings suggest that elevated AP site repair in calorie restricted animals may delay the aging process.

== Measurement approaches ==
AP sites can be mapped at single-nucleotide resolution in the human genome via click-code-seq, snAP-seq and SSiNGLe-AP.
