= Miravirsen =

Medication

Clinical data
- Other names: SPC3649
- Routes of administration: Intravenous or subcutaneous injection
- ATC code: none

Legal status
- Legal status: Investigational

Identifiers
- IUPAC name: all-P-ambo-5-methyl-2′-O,4′-C-methylene-P-thiocytidylyl-(3′→5′)-2′- deoxy-P-thiocytidylyl-(3′→5′)-2′-O,4′-C-methylene-P-thioadenylyl- (3′→5′)-P-thiothymidylyl-(3′→5′)-P-thiothymidylyl-(3′→5′)-2′-O,4′-C- methylene-P-thioguanylyl-(3′→5′)-5-methyl-2′-O,4′-C-methylene-P- thiouridylyl-(3′→5′)-2′-deoxy-P-thiocytidylyl-(3′→5′)-2′-deoxy-P- thioadenylyl-(3′→5′)-5-methyl-2′-O,4′-C-methylene-P-thiocytidylyl-(3′→5′)-2′-deoxy-P-thioadenylyl-(3′→5′)-5-methyl-2′-O,4′-C-methylene-P-thiocytidylyl-(3′→5′)-P-thiothymidylyl-(3′→5′)-5-methyl- 2′-O,4′-C-methylene-P-thiocytidylyl-(3′→5′)-5-methyl-2′-O,4′-C-methylenecytidine
- CAS Number: 1072874-90-8
- PubChem CID: 56843415
- UNII: Q083AJW7VS

Chemical and physical data
- Formula: C_{156}H_{195}N_{49}O_{83}P_{14}S_{14}
- Molar mass: 4967.01 g·mol^{−1}
- SMILES: CC=1C(=NC(N([C@H]2[C@@H]3OC[C@]([C@H]3OP(=S)(O)OC[C@@H]3[C@H](C[C@@H](O3)N3C(=O)N=C(N)C=C3)OP(=S)(O)OC[C@]34[C@H]([C@H]([C@@H](O3)N3C=NC=5C(N)=NC=NC35)OC4)OP(=S)(O)OC[C@@H]4[C@H](C[C@@H](O4)N4C(=O)NC(=O)C(C)=C4)OP(=S)(O)OC[C@@H]4[C@H](C[C@@H](O4)N4C(=O)NC(=O)C(C)=C4)OP(=S)(O)OC[C@]43[C@H]([C@H]([C@@H](O4)N4C=NC=5C(=O)NC(N)=NC45)OC3)OP(=S)(O)OC[C@]34[C@H]([C@H]([C@@H](O3)N3C(=O)NC(=O)C(=C3)C)OC4)OP(=S)(O)OC[C@@H]4[C@H](C[C@@H](O4)N4C(=O)N=C(N)C=C4)OP(=S)(O)OC[C@@H]4[C@H](C[C@@H](O4)N4C=NC=3C(N)=NC=NC43)OP(=S)(O)OC[C@]43[C@H]([C@H]([C@@H](O4)N4C(=O)N=C(N)C(=C4)C)OC3)OP(=S)(O)OC[C@@H]3[C@H](C[C@@H](O3)N3C=NC=4C(N)=NC=NC34)OP(=S)(O)OC[C@]34[C@H]([C@H]([C@@H](O3)N3C(=O)N=C(N)C(=C3)C)OC4)OP(=S)(O)OC[C@@H]4[C@H](C[C@@H](O4)N4C(=O)NC(=O)C(C)=C4)OP(=S)(O)OC[C@]43[C@H]([C@H]([C@@H](O4)N4C(=O)N=C(N)C(=C4)C)OC3)OP(=S)(O)OC[C@]34[C@H]([C@H]([C@@H](O3)N3C(=O)N=C(N)C(=C3)C)OC4)O)(CO)O2)C1)=O)N
- InChI: InChI=1S/C156H195N49O83P14S14/c1-60-21-196(140(215)180-112(60)159)129-96-104(207)150(268-129,39-238-96)46-253-301(236,315)287-109-101-133(200-25-64(5)116(163)184-144(200)219)271-153(109,42-243-101)49-256-297(232,311)279-73-18-89(195-28-67(8)126(210)189-147(195)222)264-80(73)35-251-293(228,307)283-106-98-131(198-23-62(3)114(161)182-142(198)217)269-151(106,40-240-98)48-255-300(235,314)281-75-20-91(203-57-175-93-118(165)169-54-172-121(93)203)266-82(75)36-252-294(229,308)284-107-99-132(199-24-63(4)115(162)183-143(199)218)270-152(107,41-241-99)47-254-299(234,313)280-74-19-90(202-56-174-92-117(164)168-53-171-120(92)202)265-81(74)31-247-289(224,303)275-69-14-85(191-12-10-83(157)178-138(191)213)260-76(69)32-249-292(227,306)285-108-100-134(201-29-68(9)127(211)190-148(201)223)272-154(108,43-242-100)52-259-302(237,316)288-111-103-136(205-59-177-95-123(205)185-137(167)186-128(95)212)274-156(111,45-245-103)51-258-298(233,312)278-72-17-88(194-27-66(7)125(209)188-146(194)221)262-78(72)30-246-290(225,304)276-71-16-87(193-26-65(6)124(208)187-145(193)220)263-79(71)34-250-295(230,309)286-110-102-135(204-58-176-94-119(166)170-55-173-122(94)204)273-155(110,44-244-102)50-257-296(231,310)277-70-15-86(192-13-11-84(158)179-139(192)214)261-77(70)33-248-291(226,305)282-105-97-130(267-149(105,37-206)38-239-97)197-22-61(2)113(160)181-141(197)216/h10-13,21-29,53-59,69-82,85-91,96-111,129-136,206-207H,14-20,30-52H2,1-9H3,(H,224,303)(H,225,304)(H,226,305)(H,227,306)(H,228,307)(H,229,308)(H,230,309)(H,231,310)(H,232,311)(H,233,312)(H,234,313)(H,235,314)(H,236,315)(H,237,316)(H2,157,178,213)(H2,158,179,214)(H2,159,180,215)(H2,160,181,216)(H2,161,182,217)(H2,162,183,218)(H2,163,184,219)(H2,164,168,171)(H2,165,169,172)(H2,166,170,173)(H,187,208,220)(H,188,209,221)(H,189,210,222)(H,190,211,223)(H3,167,185,186,212)/t69-,70-,71-,72-,73-,74-,75-,76+,77+,78+,79+,80+,81+,82+,85+,86+,87+,88+,89+,90+,91+,96+,97+,98+,99+,100+,101+,102+,103+,104-,105-,106-,107-,108-,109-,110-,111-,129+,130+,131+,132+,133+,134+,135+,136+,149-,150+,151+,152+,153+,154+,155+,156+,289?,290?,291?,292?,293?,294?,295?,296?,297?,298?,299?,300?,301?,302?/m0/s1; Key:RJUXZHVRDPBRSK-HZOZQJTBSA-N

Miravirsen (INN; codenamed SPC3649) is an experimental drug for the treatment of hepatitis C, being developed by Santaris Pharma. As of 2017 it was in Phase II clinical trials.

Miravirsen had been given by subcutaneous injection in early clinical trials as of 2017. It is antisense to a human microRNA called miR-122. miR-122 ferries an argonaute protein to 5'-UTR region of viral RNA, where it binds, protecting the RNA from being destroyed by normally present nucleases; by binding to miR-122, miravirsen removes that protection and the virus RNA can be destroyed. There is some evidence that the 5'-UTR region mutates under repeated exposure to miravirsen.

== Chemistry ==
Miravirsen is a modified antisense oligonucleotide consisting of a chain of 15 nucleotides, the base sequence of which is designed to selectively bind to miR-122. Seven of the 15 sugar units are deoxyriboses, and the other eight are riboses with an additional bridge between the 2' oxygen and the 4' carbon atoms; this makes miravirsen a locked nucleic acid gapmer. Furthermore, miravirsen uses phosphorothioate linkages instead of the phosphate linkages in natural oligonucleotides to make it stable towards degradation by nucleases.

The complete base sequence is

mC*-dC-A*-dT-dT-G*-mU*-dC-dA-mC*-dA-mC*-dT-mC*-mC* [d = 2'-deoxy, m = 5-methyl, * = 2'-O,4'-C-methylene, i.e. bridged or "locked" sugar]

with 3'→5' phosphorothioate linkages.

Chemical structure of a single nucleoside (sugar plus base) of a locked nucleic acid
