= Mirit I. Aladjem =

Israeli-American biologist

- מירית אלעדגם
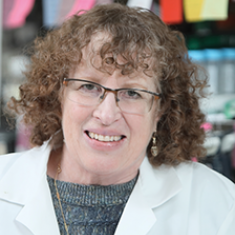
- Education: Tel Aviv University (Ph.D.)
- Scientific career
- Fields: Cell signaling, DNA synthesis
- Institutions: National Cancer Institute

Mirit I. Aladjem (Hebrew: מירית אלעדגם) is an Israeli-American biologist researching cellular signaling pathways that regulate DNA synthesis. She is a senior investigator in the National Cancer Institute's developmental therapeutics branch and head of the DNA replication group.

== Education ==
Aladjem completed a Ph.D. at Tel Aviv University. She was a research associate at the Weizmann Institute of Science and then a postdoctoral fellow and a Leukemia Society Special Fellow at the Salk Institute for Biological Studies.

== Career and research ==
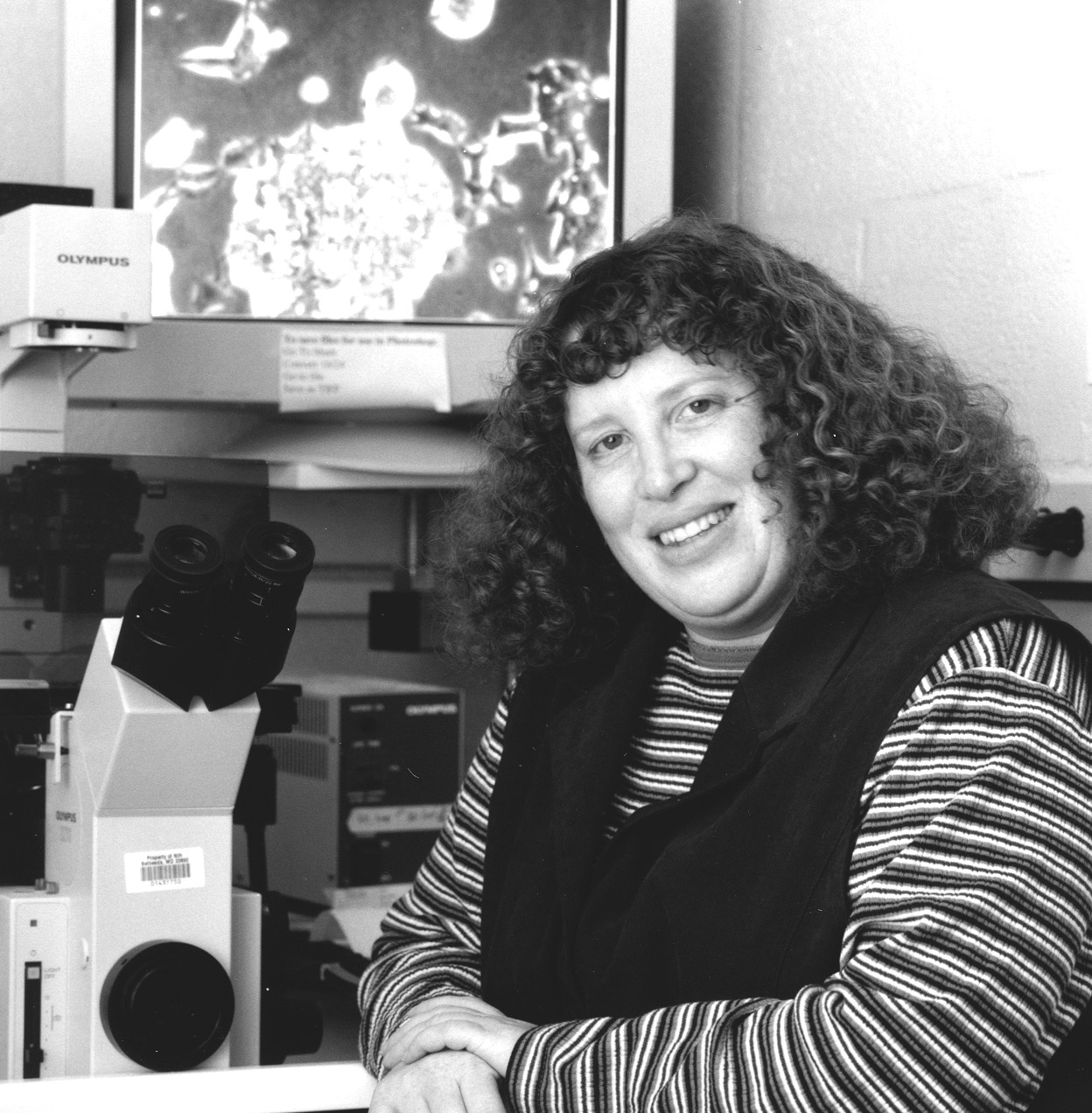
Aladjem in November 2000

Aladjem joined the National Cancer Institute's Laboratory of Molecular Pharmacology/Developmental Therapeutics Branch in October 1999 and was appointed a senior investigator in 2007. Aladjem's studies focus on cellular signaling pathways that modulate chromatin to regulate chromosome duplication and cell cycle progression. Aladjem’s team was the first to map replication origins on a whole genome scale, demonstrating a strong association between replication, histone modifications and chromatin packaging. Her current studies identified proteins that dictate whether particular chromatin regions would replicate during normal growth and after exposure to anti-cancer therapy.

== Notable publications ==
- Novère, Nicolas Le; Hucka, Michael; Mi, Huaiyu; Moodie, Stuart; Schreiber, Falk; Sorokin, Anatoly; Demir, Emek; Wegner, Katja; Aladjem, Mirit I; Wimalaratne, Sarala M; Bergman, Frank T; Gauges, Ralph; Ghazal, Peter; Kawaji, Hideya; Li, Lu; Matsuoka, Yukiko; Villéger, Alice; Boyd, Sarah E; Calzone, Laurence; Courtot, Melanie; Dogrusoz, Ugur; Freeman, Tom C; Funahashi, Akira; Ghosh, Samik; Jouraku, Akiya; Kim, Sohyoung; Kolpakov, Fedor; Luna, Augustin; Sahle, Sven; Schmidt, Esther; Watterson, Steven; Wu, Guanming; Goryanin, Igor; Kell, Douglas B; Sander, Chris; Sauro, Herbert; Snoep, Jacky L; Kohn, Kurt; Kitano, Hiroaki (2009). "The Systems Biology Graphical Notation". Nature Biotechnology. 27 (8). Nature Portfolio: 735–741. doi:10.1038/nbt.1558. ISSN 1087-0156. PMID 19668183. S2CID 11156729.
