= Locked nucleic acid =

Biological molecule

Chemical structure of an LNA monomer an additional bridge bonds the 2' oxygen and the 4' carbon of the pentose

A locked nucleic acid (LNA), often referred to as inaccessible RNA, is a modified RNA nucleotide in which the ribose moiety is modified with an extra bridge connecting the 2' oxygen and 4' carbon. The bridge "locks" the ribose in the 3'-endo (North) conformation, which is often found in the A-form duplexes. This structure provides for increased stability against enzymatic degradation. LNA also offers improved specificity and affinity in base-pairing as a monomer or a constituent of an oligonucleotide. LNA nucleotides can be mixed with DNA or RNA residues in a oligonucleotide. LNA is one type of bridged nucleic acid.

== Synthesis ==
Obika et al. were the first to chemically synthesize LNA in 1997, independently followed by Jesper Wengel's group in 1998. This became possible after Zamecnick and Stephenson laid the groundwork on the possibility of oligonucleotides being great agents for controlling gene expression in 1978. To date, two different approaches, referred to as linear and convergent strategies respectively, have been shown to produce high yield and efficient LNAs. The linear strategy of synthesis was first detailed in the works of Obika et al. In this approach, uridine (or any readily available RNA nucleoside) can be used as the starting material. The convergent strategy requires the synthesis of a sugar intermediate which serves a glycosyl donor necessary for coupling with nucleobases. Commonly, D-glucose is used to produce the sugar intermediate which is subsequently reacted with nucleobases using a modified Vorbrügen procedure allowing for stereoselective coupling.

The addition of different moieties has remained a possibility with the maintenance of key physicochemical properties like the high affinity and specificity evident in the originally synthesized LNA. Such oligomers are synthesized chemically and are commercially available.

=== Incorporation into DNA/RNA ===
LNA can be incorporated into DNA and RNA using the promiscuity of certain DNA and RNA polymerases. Phusion DNA polymerase, a commercially designed enzyme based on a Pfu DNA polymerase, efficiently incorporates LNA into DNA.

== Properties ==
LNA offers enhanced biostability compared to biological nucleic acids. LNA modified oligonucleotides have demonstrated improved thermodynamics in hybridization to RNA, ssDNA, and dsDNA.

== Applications ==
=== LNAzymes ===
DNAzymes can be modified to include LNA residues, producing LNAzymes (LNA-modified DNAzymes). These modified oligonucleotides, like their DNAzyme relatives, are generally endonucleases that bind to specific RNA target sequences and cleave the phosphodiester bond that exists between the nucleotides. However, they demonstrate more efficient cleavage of phosphodiester bonds compared to their unmodified counterparts. Modification of the substrate recognition arms of DNAzymes with LNA monomers yields a LNAzyme which recognizes coxsackievirus A21 (CAV-21) and cleaves its RNA target sequence similar to one in the 5' untranslated region (5' UTR) of the human rhinovirus-14 (HRV-14); a sequence unrecognized by unmodified DNAzymes.

=== Therapeutics ===
Using LNA based oligonucleotides therapeutically is an emerging field in biotechnology. A variety of LNA oligonucleotides have been assessed for their pharmacokinetic and toxicity profiles. Studies concluded that LNA toxicity is generally independent of oligonucleotide sequence, and displays a preferential safety profile for translatable therapeutic applications.

LNA has been investigated for its therapeutic properties in treating cancers and infectious diseases. A locked nucleic acid phosphorothioate antisense molecule, termed SPC2996, has been developed to target the mRNA coding for Bcl-2 oncoprotein, a protein that inhibits apoptosis in chronic lymphocytic leukemia cells (CLL). Phase I and II clinical trials demonstrated a dose dependent reduction in circulating CLL cells in approximately 30% of the sample population, suggesting further investigation into SPC2996.

LNA has also been applied to Miravirsen, an experimental therapeutic intended for the treatment of Hepatitis C, constituting a 15-nucleotide phosphorothioate sequence with binding specificity for MiR-122 (a miRNA expressed in hepatocytes).

=== Detection and diagnosis ===
Allele-specific PCR using LNA allows for the design of shorter primers, without compromising binding specificity.

LNA has been incorporated in fluorescence in situ hybridization (FISH). FISH is a common technique used to visualize genetic material in a variety of cells, but studies noted that this technique has been limited by low probe hybridization efficiency. Conversely, LNA-incorporated probes demonstrated increased hybridization efficiency in both DNA and RNA. The improved efficiency of LNA-incorporated FISH has resulted in FISH analysis of the human chromosome, several types of non-human cells, and microarrays.

LNA genotyping assays have been conducted as well, specifically to detect a mutation in apolipoprotein B.

For its high affinity for mismatch discrimination, LNA has been studied for its applications in diagnostic tools. Immobilized LNA probes have been introduced in a multiplex SNP genotyping assay.

=== Gene editing ===
LNA-modified ssODNs (synthetic single-stranded DNA oligonucleotides) can be used like ordinary ssODNs for single-base gene editing. Using LNA at or close to the intended site of modification offers evasion of DNA mismatch repair due to the higher thermodynamic stability it has.
