= PAH world hypothesis =

Hypothesis about the origin of life

The PAH world hypothesis is a speculative hypothesis that proposes that polycyclic aromatic hydrocarbons (PAHs), known to be abundant in the universe, including in comets, and assumed to be abundant in the primordial soup of the early Earth, played a major role in the origin of life by mediating the synthesis of RNA molecules, leading into the RNA world. However, as yet, the hypothesis is untested.

A PAH stack assembling

== Background ==
The Miller–Urey experiment showed that organic compounds can be readily produced under the presumed conditions of the early Earth.

The 1952 Miller–Urey experiment demonstrated the synthesis of organic compounds, such as amino acids, formaldehyde and sugars, from the original inorganic precursors the researchers presumed to have been present in the primordial soup (but is no longer considered likely). This experiment inspired many others. In 1961, Joan Oró found that the nucleotide base adenine could be made from hydrogen cyanide (HCN) and ammonia in a water solution. Experiments conducted later showed that the other RNA and DNA nucleobases could be obtained through simulated prebiotic chemistry with a reducing atmosphere.

The RNA world hypothesis shows how RNA can become its own catalyst (a ribozyme). In between there are some missing steps such as how the first RNA molecules could be formed. The PAH world hypothesis was proposed by Simon Nicholas Platts in May 2004 to try to fill in this missing step. A more thoroughly elaborated idea has been published by Ehrenfreund et al.

== Polycyclic aromatic hydrocarbons ==
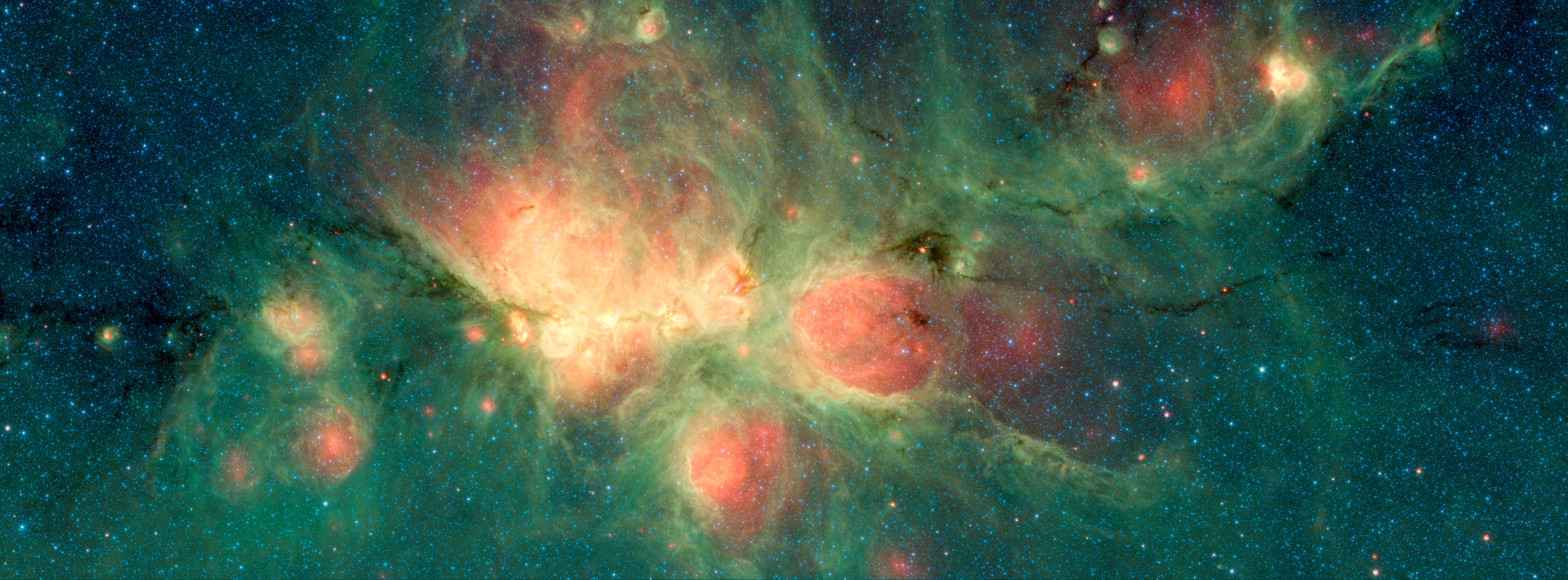
The Cat's Paw Nebula lies inside the Milky Way Galaxy and is located in the constellation Scorpius. Green areas show regions where radiation from hot stars collided with large molecules and small dust grains (PAHs), causing them to fluoresce. (Spitzer Space Telescope, 2018)

Polycyclic aromatic hydrocarbons are the most common and abundant of the known polyatomic molecules in the visible universe, and are considered a likely constituent of the primordial sea. PAHs, along with fullerenes, have been recently detected in nebulae. Buckyballs, a type of fullerene, have been identified in the interstellar medium (ISM). Fullerenes are also implicated in the origin of life; according to astronomer Letizia Stanghellini, "It's possible that buckyballs from outer space provided seeds for life on Earth." PAHs, subjected to ISM conditions, are transformed, through hydrogenation, oxygenation and hydroxylation, to more complex organic compounds — "a step along the path toward amino acids and nucleotides, the raw materials of proteins and DNA, respectively". Further, as a result of these transformations, the PAHs lose their spectroscopic signature which could be one of the reasons "for the lack of PAH detection in interstellar ice grains, particularly the outer regions of cold, dense clouds or the upper molecular layers of protoplanetary disks."

Low-temperature chemical pathways from simple organic compounds to complex PAHs have been demonstrated. Such chemical pathways may help explain the presence of PAHs in the low-temperature upper atmosphere of Saturn's moon Titan (detected in 2013), and may be significant pathways, in terms of the PAH world hypothesis, in producing precursors to biochemicals related to life as we know it.

PAHs are not normally very soluble in sea water, but when subject to ionizing radiation such as solar UV light, the outer hydrogen atoms can be stripped off and replaced with a hydroxyl group, rendering the PAHs far more soluble. These modified PAHs are amphiphilic, meaning they have both hydrophilic and hydrophobic regions. When in solution, they assemble in discotic mesogenic stacks which, like lipids, tend to organize with their hydrophobic parts protected.

In 2014, NASA announced a database for tracking PAHs in the universe. More than 20% of the carbon in the universe may be associated with PAHs, possible starting materials for the formation of life. PAHs seem to have been formed as early as a couple of billion years after the Big Bang, are abundant in the universe, and are associated with new stars and exoplanets.

== Reactions ==
=== Attachment of nucleobases to PAH scaffolding ===
In the self-ordering PAH stack, the separation between adjacent rings is 0.34 nm. This is the same separation found between adjacent nucleotides of RNA and DNA. Smaller molecules will naturally attach themselves to the PAH rings. However PAH rings, while forming, tend to swivel around on one another, which will tend to dislodge attached compounds that would collide with those attached to those above and below. Therefore, it encourages preferential attachment of flat molecules such as pyrimidine and purine nucleobases, the key constituents (and information carriers) of RNA and DNA. These bases are similarly amphiphilic and so also tend to line up in similar stacks.

=== Attachment of oligomeric backbone ===
According to the hypothesis, once the nucleobases are attached (via hydrogen bonds) to the PAH scaffolding, the inter-base distance would select for "linker" molecules of a specific size, such as small formaldehyde (methanal) oligomers, also taken from the prebiotic "soup", which will bind (via covalent bonds) to the nucleobases as well as each other to add a flexible structural backbone.

=== Detachment of the RNA-like strands ===
A subsequent transient drop in the ambient pH (increase in acidity), for example as a result of a volcanic discharge of acidic gases such as sulfur dioxide or carbon dioxide, would allow the bases to break off from their PAH scaffolding, forming RNA-like molecules (with the formaldehyde backbone instead of the ribose-phosphate backbone used by "modern" RNA, but the same 0.34 nm pitch).

=== Formation of ribozyme-like structures ===
The hypothesis further speculates that once long RNA-like single strands are detached from the PAH stacks, and after ambient pH levels became less acidic, they would tend to fold back on themselves, with complementary sequences of nucleobases preferentially seeking out each other and forming hydrogen bonds, creating stable, at least partially double-stranded RNA-like structures, similar to ribozymes. The formaldehyde oligomers would eventually be replaced with more stable ribose-phosphate molecules for the backbone material, resulting in a starting milestone for the RNA world hypothesis, which speculates about further evolutionary developments from that point.

== See also ==
- Astrochemistry
- Atomic and molecular astrophysics
- Cosmochemistry
- Extragalactic astronomy
- Extraterrestrial materials
- History of the Earth
- Iron-sulfur world theory
- List of interstellar and circumstellar molecules
- Thermosynthesis
- Tholin
- Other possible RNA precursors:
  - Glycol nucleic acid (GNA)
  - Peptide nucleic acid (PNA)
  - Threose nucleic acid (TNA)
