= Philipp Holliger =

Swiss molecular biologist

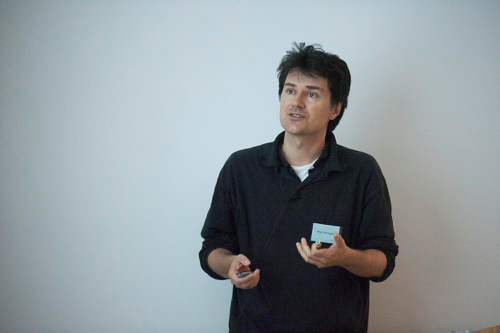
- Education: ETH Zurich, MRC Centre for Protein Engineering (PhD)
- Scientific career
- Fields: Molecular biology, Synthetic biology, Xenobiology
- Workplaces: MRC Centre for Protein Engineering, MRC Laboratory of Molecular Biology
- Thesis: Multivalent and bispecific antibody fragments from E. coli (1994)
- Doctoral advisor: Sir Gregory Winter, Professor Tim Richmond
- Website: https://www2.mrc-lmb.cam.ac.uk/group-leaders/h-to-m/philipp-holliger/

Philipp Holliger is a Swiss molecular biologist best known for his work on xeno nucleic acids (XNAs) and RNA engineering. Holliger is a program leader at the MRC Laboratory of Molecular Biology (MRC LMB) and has served as Joint Head and latterly sole Head of the Protein and Nucleic Acid (PNAC) Division since May 2024.

== Background ==
He earned his degree in Natural Sciences (Dipl. Natwiss. ETH) from ETH Zürich, Switzerland, where he worked with Steven Benner, and his Ph.D. in Molecular Biology at the MRC Centre for Protein Engineering (CPE) in Cambridge under the mentorship of Sir Gregory Winter (CPE and MRC LMB) and Tim Richmond (ETH).

While in the Winter laboratory, Holliger developed a new type of bispecific antibody fragment, called a diabody and worked on elucidating the infection pathway of filamentous bacteriophages.

After he became an independent group leader at the MRC LMB, Holliger shifted his research focus towards synthetic biology, where he developed methods for emulsion-PCR and in vitro evolution. Holliger was elected a member of EMBO in 2015.

== Research ==
XNAs

Combining nucleic acid chemistry with methods for in vitro evolution he developed, Holliger and colleagues were able to reprogram replicative DNA polymerases for the synthesis and reverse transcription of synthetic genetic polymers with entirely unnatural backbones (XNAs). This showed for the first time that synthetic alternatives to DNA could store genetic information just like DNA.

Further work by the Holliger lab enabled the in vitro evolution of XNA ligands (aptamers) and XNA catalysts similar to RNA enzymes (known as ribozymes), termed XNAzymes as well as the elaboration of simple XNA nanostructures. The unnatural backbone chemistries of XNA molecules exhibit novel and useful properties. For example, unlike the natural nucleic acids, some XNAs cannot be broken down easily by the human body or are chemically much more stable. Recently, Holliger also described the synthesis and evolution of XNAs with an uncharged backbone, showing that genetic function (i.e. heredity and evolution) is possible – in contrast to previous proposals – even in the absence of a charged backbone.

Origin of life

Holliger has also made contributions towards a better understanding of early steps in the origin of life. One scenario, termed the RNA world hypothesis, suggests that a key event in the origin of life was the emergence of an RNA molecule capable of self-replication and evolution, founding a primordial biology (lacking DNA and proteins) that relied on RNA for its main building blocks. Starting from a previously discovered ribozyme with RNA polymerase activity, Holliger and colleagues initially engineered an RNA polymerase ribozyme capable of synthesising another ribozyme and subsequently RNA sequences longer than itself. More recently, he described the first polymerase ribozyme that can use nucleotide triplets to copy highly structured RNA templates including segments of itself.

In the course of this work, Holliger explored the properties of water ice, a simple medium likely to have been widespread on the early Earth, and found that it promotes the activity, stability and evolution of RNA polymerase ribozymes and the ability of diverse pools of RNA sequences to recombine enhancing pool complexity. He also discovered that the steep concentration and temperature gradients resulting from freeze-thaw cycles could be harnessed to drive ribozyme assembly and folding, acting akin to chaperones in modern biology.
