= Hazards of synthetic biology =

Dangers presented by artificial and modified organisms

The hazards of synthetic biology include biosafety hazards to workers and the public, biosecurity hazards stemming from deliberate engineering of organisms to cause harm, and hazards to the environment. The biosafety hazards are similar to those for existing fields of biotechnology, mainly exposure to pathogens and toxic chemicals; however, novel synthetic organisms may have novel risks. For biosecurity, there is concern that synthetic or redesigned organisms could theoretically be used for bioterrorism. Potential biosecurity risks include recreating known pathogens from scratch, engineering existing pathogens to be more dangerous, and engineering microbes to produce harmful biochemicals. Lastly, environmental hazards include adverse effects on biodiversity and ecosystem services, including potential changes to land use resulting from agricultural use of synthetic organisms.

In general, existing hazard controls, risk assessment methodologies, and regulations developed for traditional genetically modified organisms (GMOs) also apply to synthetic organisms. "Extrinsic" biocontainment methods used in laboratories include biosafety cabinets and gloveboxes, as well as personal protective equipment. In agriculture, they include isolation distances and pollen barriers, similar to methods for biocontainment of GMOs. Synthetic organisms might potentially offer increased hazard control because they can be engineered with "intrinsic" biocontainment methods that limit their growth in an uncontained environment, or prevent horizontal gene transfer to natural organisms. Examples of intrinsic biocontainment include auxotrophy, biological kill switches, inability of the organism to replicate or to pass synthetic genes to offspring, and the use of xenobiological organisms using alternative biochemistry, for example using artificial xeno nucleic acids (XNA) instead of DNA.

Existing risk analysis systems for GMOs are generally applicable to synthetic organisms, although there may be difficulties for an organisms built "bottom-up" from individual genetic sequences. Synthetic biology generally falls under existing regulations for GMOs and biotechnology in general, as well as any regulations that exist for downstream commercial products, although there are generally no regulations in any jurisdiction that are specific to synthetic biology.

== Background ==
Synthetic biology is an outgrowth of biotechnology distinguished by the use of biological pathways or organisms not found in nature. This contrasts with "traditional" genetically modified organisms created by transferring existing genes from one cell type to another. Major goals of synthetic biology include re-designing genes, cells, or organisms for gene therapy; development of minimal cells and artificial protocells; and development of organisms based on alternative biochemistry. This work has been driven by the development of genome synthesis and editing tools, as well as pools of standardized synthetic biological circuits with defined functions. The availability of these tools has spurred the expansion of a do-it-yourself biology movement.

Synthetic biology has potential commercial applications in energy, agriculture, medicine, and the production of chemicals including pharmaceuticals. Biosynthetic applications are often distinguished as either for "contained use" within laboratories and manufacturing facilities, or for "intentional release" outside of the laboratory for medical, veterinary, cosmetic, or agricultural applications. As synthetic biology applications become increasingly used in industry, the number and variety of workers exposed to synthetic biology risk is expected to increase.

== Hazards ==
=== Biosafety ===
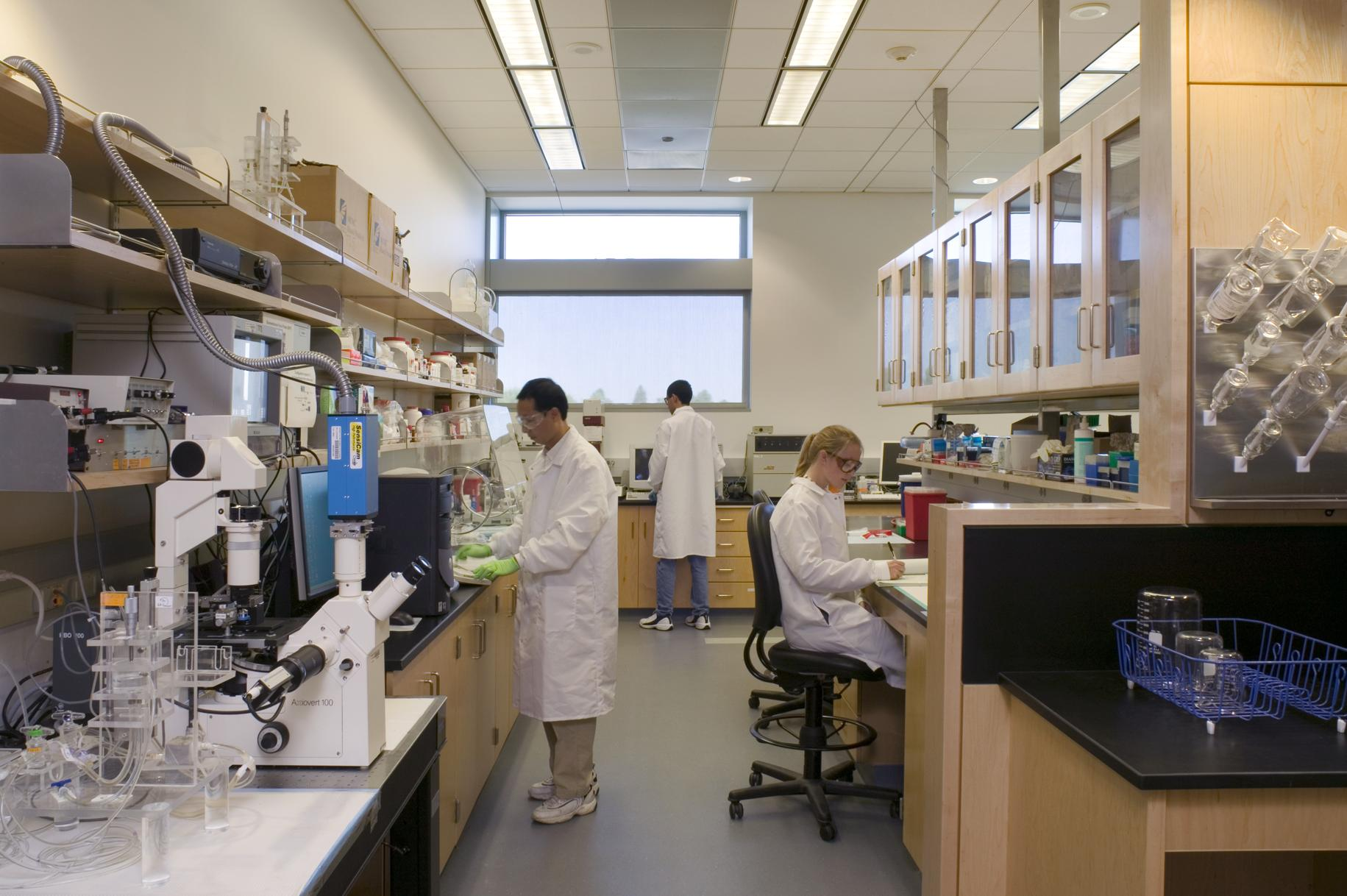
Microbiology laboratories present multiple chemical, biological, and physical hazards that can be mitigated with laboratory safety methods.

Biosafety hazards to workers from synthetic biology are similar to those in existing fields of biotechnology, mainly exposure to pathogens and toxic chemicals used in a laboratory or industrial setting. These include hazardous chemicals; biological hazards including organisms, prions, and biologically-derived toxins; physical hazards such as ergonomic hazards, radiation, and noise hazards; and additional hazards of injury from autoclaves, centrifuges, compressed gas, cryogens, and electrical hazards.

Novel protocells or xenobiological organisms, as well as gene editing of higher animals, may have novel biosafety hazards that affect their risk assessment. As of 2018, most laboratory biosafety guidance is based on preventing exposure to existing rather than new pathogens. Lentiviral vectors derived from the HIV-1 virus are widely used in gene therapy due to their unique ability to infect both dividing and non-dividing cells, but unintentional exposure of workers could lead to cancer and other diseases. In the case of an unintentional exposure, antiretroviral drugs can be used as post-exposure prophylaxis.

Given the overlap between synthetic biology and the do-it-yourself biology movement, concerns have been raised that its practitioners may not abide by risk assessment and biosafety practices required of professionals, although it has been suggested that an informal code of ethics exists that recognizes health risks and other adverse outcomes.

=== Biosecurity ===
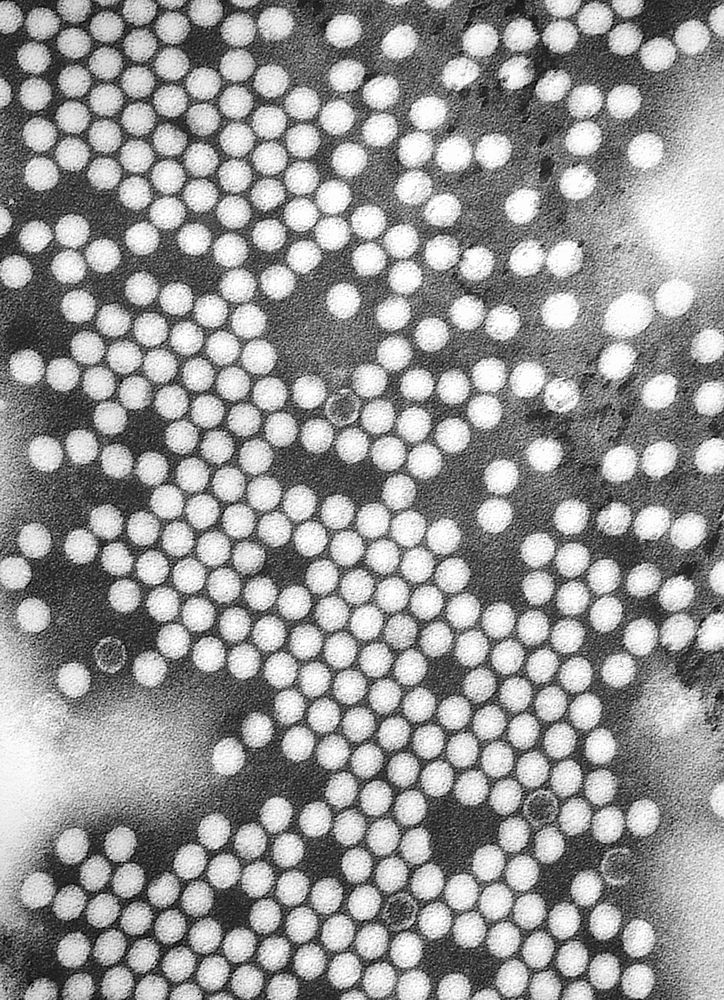
Poliovirus was among the first virus genomes synthesized from scratch and used to create viruses capable of infection. This has led to concern that it and other infectious viruses could be manufactured for harmful purposes.

The rise of synthetic biology has also spurred biosecurity concerns that synthetic or redesigned organisms could be engineered for bioterrorism. This is considered possible but unlikely given the resources needed to perform this kind of research. However, synthetic biology could expand the group of people with relevant capabilities, and reduce the amount of time needed to develop them.

A 2018 National Academies of Sciences, Engineering, and Medicine (NASEM) report identified three capabilities as being of greatest concern. The first is the recreation of known pathogens from scratch, for example using genome synthesis to recreate historical viruses such as the Spanish Flu virus or polio virus. Current technology allows genome synthesis for almost any mammalian virus, the sequences of known human viruses are publicly available, and the procedure has relatively low cost and requires access to basic laboratory equipment. However, the pathogens would have known properties and could be mitigated by standard public health measures, and could be partially prevented by screening of commercially produced DNA molecules. In contrast to viruses, creating existing bacteria or completely novel pathogens from scratch was not yet possible as of 2018, and was considered a low risk.

Another capability of concern cited by NASEM is engineering existing pathogens to be more dangerous. This includes altering the targeted host or tissue, as well as enhancing the pathogen's replication, virulence, transmissibility, or stability; or its ability to produce toxins, reactivate from a dormant state, evade natural or vaccine-induced immunity, or evade detection. The NASEM considered engineered bacteria to be a higher risk than viruses because they are easier to manipulate and their genomes are more stable over time.

A final capability of concern cited by NASEM is engineering microbes to produce harmful biochemicals. Metabolic engineering of microorganisms is a well established field that has targeted production of fuels, chemicals, food ingredients, and pharmaceuticals, but it could be used to produce toxins, antimetabolites, controlled substances, explosives, or chemical weapons. This was considered to be a higher risk for naturally occurring substances than for artificial ones.

There is also the possibility of novel threats that were considered lower risks by NASEM due to their technical challenges. Delivery of an engineered organism into the human microbiome has the challenges of delivery and persistence in the microbiome, though an attack would be difficult to detect and mitigate. Pathogens engineered to alter the human immune system by causing immunodeficiency, hyperreactivity, or autoimmunity, or to directly alter the human genome, were also considered lower-risk due to extreme technical challenges.

=== Environmental ===
Environmental hazards include toxicity to animals and plants, as well as adverse effects on biodiversity and ecosystem services. For example, a toxin engineered into a plant to resist specific insect pests may also affect other invertebrates. Some highly speculative hazards include engineered organisms becoming invasive and outcompeting natural ones, and horizontal gene transfer from engineered to natural organisms. Gene drives to suppress disease vectors may inadvertently affect the target species' fitness and alter ecosystem balance.

In addition, synthetic biology could lead to land-use changes, such as non-food synthetic organisms displacing other agricultural uses or wild land. It could also cause products to be produced by non-agricultural means or through large-scale commercial farming, which could economically outcompete small-scale farmers. Finally, there is a risk that conservation methods based on synthetic biology, such as de-extinction, may reduce support for traditional conservation efforts.

== Hazard controls ==
=== Extrinsic ===
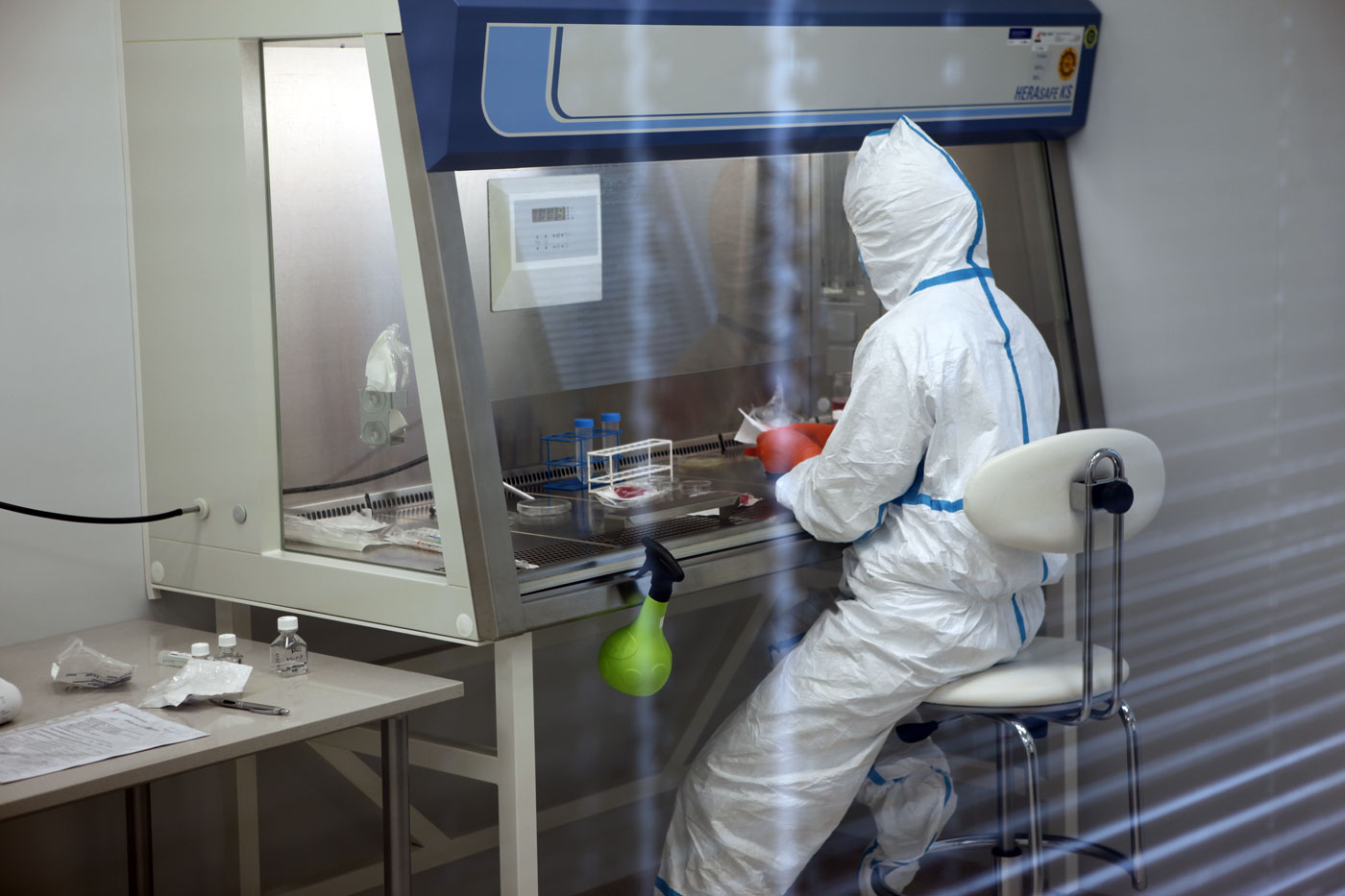
Biosafety cabinets are designed to contain bioaerosols and are an example of extrinsic containment.

Extrinsic biocontainment encompasses physical containment through engineering controls such as biosafety cabinets and gloveboxes, as well as personal protective equipment including gloves, coats, gowns, shoe covers, boots, respirators, face shields, safety glasses, and goggles. In addition, facilities used for synthetic biology may include decontamination areas, specialized ventilation and air treatment systems, and separation of laboratory work areas from public access. These procedures are common to all microbiological laboratories.

In agriculture, extrinsic biocontainment methods include maintaining isolation distances and physical pollen barriers to prevent modified organisms from fertilizing wild-type plants, as well as sowing modified and wild-type seed at different times so that their flowering periods do not overlap.

=== Intrinsic ===
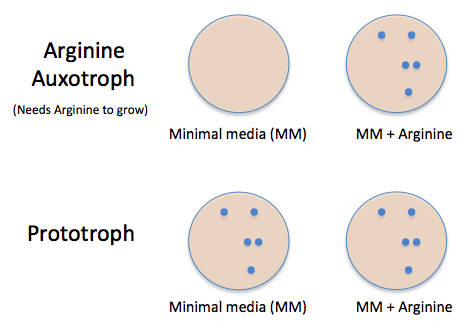
Auxotrophy is an intrinsic biocontainment method where an organism is unable to synthesize a particular compound required for its growth. This is intended to reduce the risk that it can survive after an accidental release or exposure event.

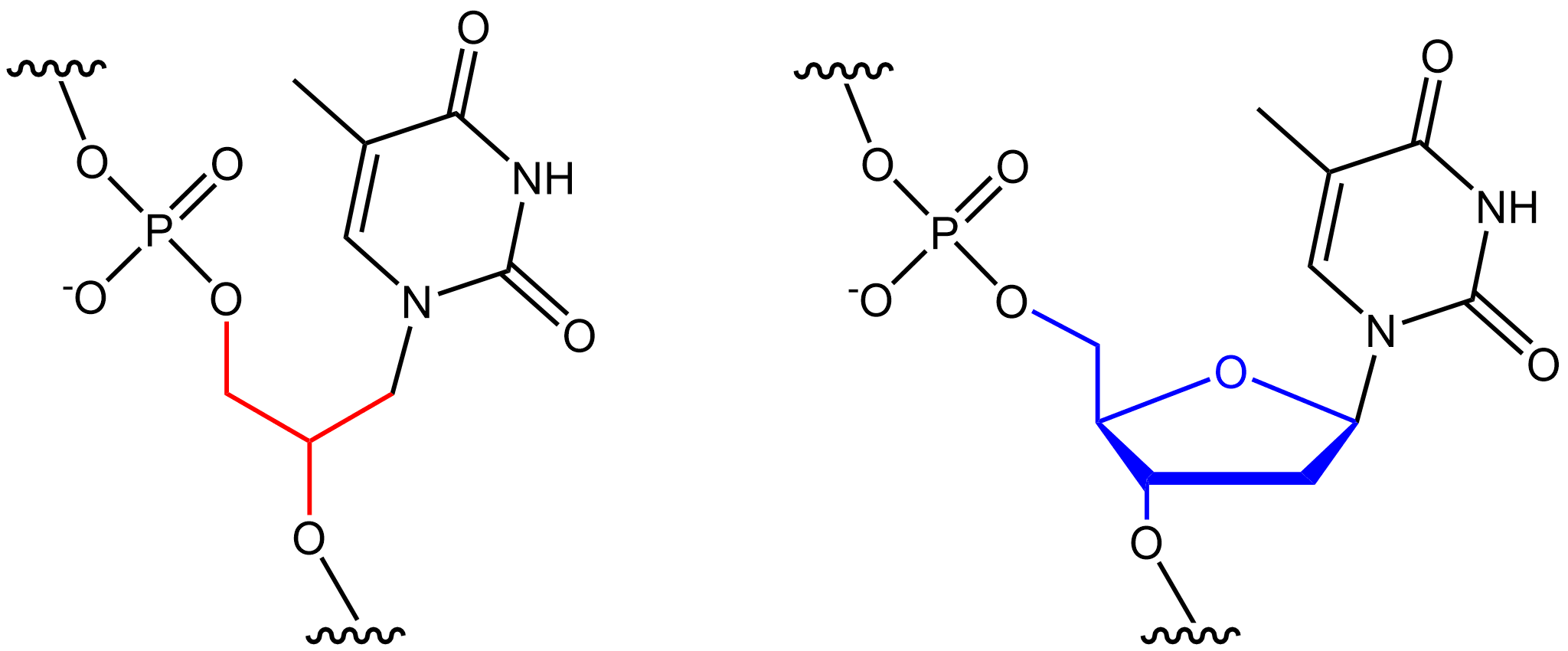
Synthetic organisms that use xeno nucleic acids (example, left) instead of DNA (right) have been proposed as an intrinsic biocontainment strategy to prevent contamination of natural organisms through horizontal gene transfer.

Intrinsic biocontainment is the proactive design of functionalities or deficiencies into organisms and systems to reduce their hazards. It is unique to engineered organisms such as GMOs and synthetic organisms, and is an example of hazard substitution and of prevention through design. Intrinsic biocontainment can have many goals, including controlling growth in the laboratory or after an unintentional release, preventing horizontal gene transfer to natural cells, preventing use for bioterrorism, or protecting the intellectual property of the organism's designers. There has been concern that existing genetic safeguards are not reliable enough due to the organism's ability to lose them through mutation. However, they may be useful in combination with other hazard controls, and may provide enhanced protections relative to GMOs.

Many approaches fall under the umbrella of intrinsic biocontainment. Auxotrophy is the inability of an organism to synthesize a particular compound required for its growth, meaning that the organism cannot survive unless the compound is provided to it. A kill switch is a pathway that initiates cell death that is triggered by a signal from humans. Inability of the organisms to replicate is another such method.

Methods specific to plants include cytoplasmic male sterility, where viable pollen cannot be produced; and transplastomic plants where modifications are made only to the chloroplast DNA, which is not incorporated into pollen.

Methods specific to viral vectors include splitting key components between multiple plasmids, omitting accessory proteins related to the wild-type virus' function as a pathogen but not as a vector, and the use of self-inactivating vectors.

It has been speculated that xenobiology, the use of alternative biochemistry that differs from natural DNA and proteins, may enable novel intrinsic biocontainment methods that are not possible with traditional GMOs. This would involve engineering organisms that use artificial xeno nucleic acids (XNA) instead of DNA and RNA, or that have an altered or expanded genetic code. These would be theoretically incapable of horizontal gene transfer to natural cells. There is speculation that these methods may have lower failure rates than traditional methods.

== Risk assessment ==
While the hazards of synthetic biology are similar to those of existing biotechnology, risk assessment procedures may differ given the rapidity with which new components and organisms are generated. Existing risk analysis systems for GMOs are also applicable for synthetic organisms, and workplace health surveillance can be used to enhance risk assessment. However, there may be difficulties in risk assessment for an organism built "bottom-up" from individual genetic sequences rather than from a donor organism with known traits. Synthetic organisms also may not be included in preexisting classifications of microorganisms into risk groups. An additional challenge is that synthetic biology engages a wide range of disciplines outside of biology, whose practitioners may be unfamiliar with microbiological risk assessment.

For biosecurity, risk assessment includes evaluating the ease of use by potential actors; its efficacy as a weapon; practical requirements such as access to expertise and resources; and the capability to prevent, anticipate, and respond to an attack. For environmental hazards, risk assessments and field trials of synthetic biology applications are most effective when they include metrics on non-target organisms and ecosystem functions. Some researchers have suggested that traditional life-cycle assessment methods may be insufficient because unlike with traditional industries, the boundary between industry the environment is blurred, and materials have an information-rich description that cannot be described only by their chemical formula.

== Regulation ==
=== International ===
Several treaties contain provisions which apply to synthetic biology. These include the Convention on Biological Diversity, Cartagena Protocol on Biosafety, Nagoya–Kuala Lumpur Supplementary Protocol on Liability, Biological Weapons Convention, and Australia Group Guidelines.

=== United States ===
In general, the United States relies on the regulatory frameworks established for chemicals and pharmaceuticals to regulate synthetic biology, mainly the Toxic Substances Control Act of 1976 as updated by the Frank R. Lautenberg Chemical Safety for the 21st Century Act, as well as the Federal Food, Drug, and Cosmetic Act.

The biosafety concerns about synthetic biology and its gene-editing tools are similar to the concerns lodged about recombinant DNA technology when it emerged in the mid-1970s. The recommendations of the 1975 Asilomar Conference on Recombinant DNA formed the basis for the U.S. National Institutes of Health (NIH) guidelines, which were updated in 2013 to address organisms and viruses containing synthetic nucleic acid molecules. The NIH Guidelines for Research Involving Recombinant and Synthetic Nucleic Molecules are the most comprehensive resource for synthetic biology safety. Although they are only binding on recipients of NIH funding, other government and private funders sometimes require their use, and they are often voluntarily implemented by others. In addition, the 2010 NIH Screening Framework Guidance for Providers of Synthetic Double-Stranded DNA provides voluntary guidelines for vendors of synthetic DNA to verify the identity and affiliation of buyers, and screen for sequences of concern.

The Occupational Safety and Health Administration (OSHA) regulates the health and safety of workers, including those involved in synthetic biology. In the mid-1980s, OSHA maintained that the general duty clause and existing regulatory standards were sufficient to protect biotechnology workers.

The Environmental Protection Agency, Department of Agriculture Animal and Plant Health Inspection Service, and Food and Drug Administration regulate the commercial production and use of genetically modified organisms. The Department of Commerce Bureau of Industry and Security has authority over dual-use technology, and synthetic biology falls under select agent rules.

=== Other countries ===
In the European Union, synthetic biology is governed by Directives 2001/18/EC on the intentional release of GMOs, and 2009/41/EC on the contained use of genetically modified micro-organisms, as well as Directive 2000/54/EC on biological agents in the workplace. As of 2012, neither the European Community nor any member state had specific legislation on synthetic biology.

In the United Kingdom, the Genetically Modified Organisms (Contained Use) Regulations 2000 and subsequent updates are the main law relevant to synthetic biology. China had not developed synthetic biology specific regulations as of 2012, relying on regulations developed for GMOs. Singapore relies on its Biosafety Guidelines for GMOs, Biological Agents and Toxins Act, and the Workplace Safety and Health Act.

== See also ==
- Biosafety level
- Regulation of genetic engineering
- Biocontainment of genetically modified organisms
