= Xeno nucleic acid =

Synthetic nucleic acid analogues

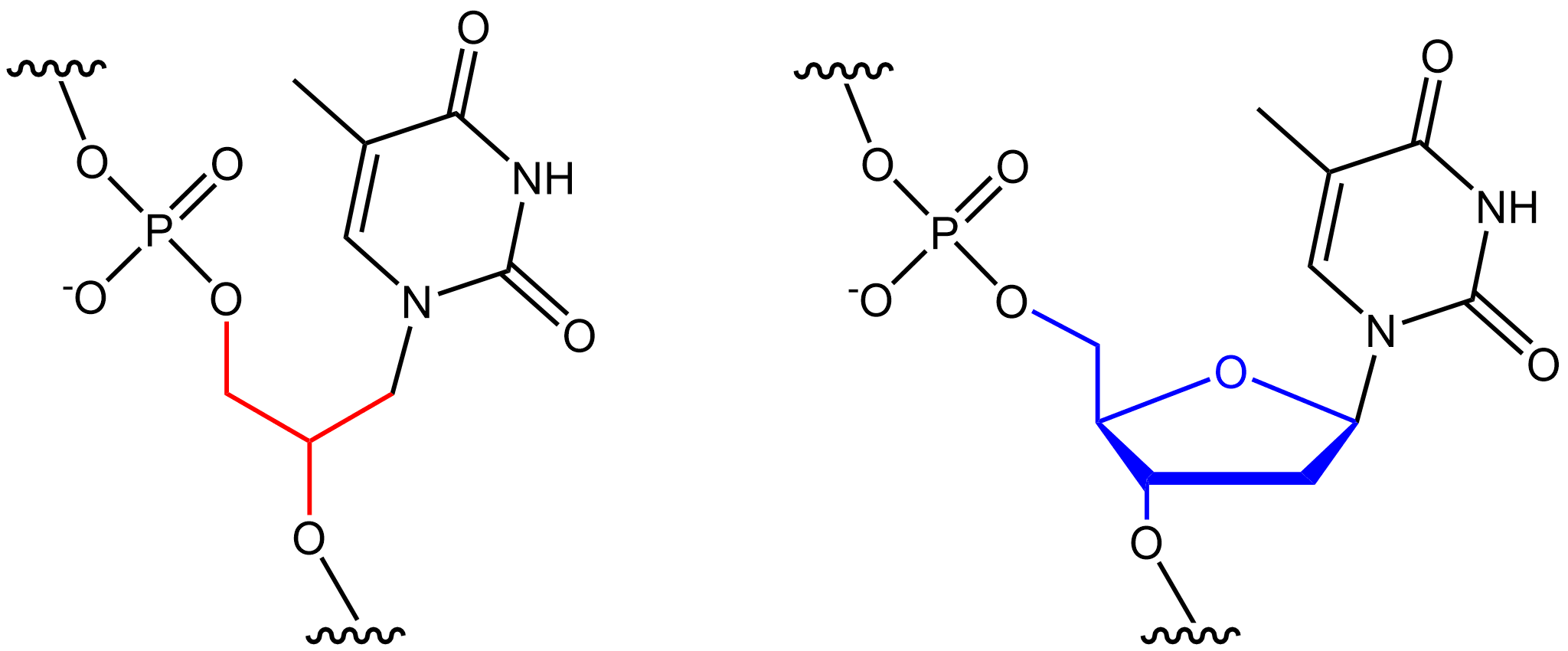
Glycol nucleic acid (left) is an example of a xeno nucleic acid because it has a different backbone than DNA (right).

Xenonucleic acids (XNAs) are synthetic nucleic acid analogues that are engineered with a structurally distinct sugar component, as opposed to the nucleobase or phosphate.

XNAs have fundamentally different properties from endogenous nucleic acids, enabling different specialized applications, such as therapeutics, probes, or functional molecules. For instance, peptide nucleic acids, the backbones of which are made up of repeating aminoethylglycine units, are extremely stable and resistant to degradation by nucleases because they are not recognised.

The same nucleobases can be used to store genetic information and interact with DNA, RNA, or other XNA bases, but the different backbone gives the compound different properties. Their altered chemical structure means they cannot be processed by naturally occurring cellular processes. For instance, natural DNA polymerases cannot read and duplicate the alien information, thus the genetic information stored in XNA is invisible to DNA-based organisms.

As of 2011, at least six types of synthetic sugars have been shown to form nucleic acid backbones that can store and retrieve genetic information. Research is now being focused to create synthetic polymerases to transform XNAs. The study of the production and application of XNA molecules has created the field of current xenobiology.

== History ==
The term "xeno nucleic acid" was coined in 2009, being used in a xenobiology context. However, many sugar-modified nucleic acids had been created long before the term was created.

Nearly five decades after DNA was first discovered, around the early 2000s, researchers created a number of exotic DNA-like structures which would later be called XNAs. These are synthetic polymers that can carry the same information as a DNA, but with different molecular constituents. The initial X in the term XNA derives from the systematic prefix xeno- (Greek: ξένος, "foreign") and indicates the difference in the molecular structure as compared to those of DNA or RNA.

Initial XNA research yielded limited practical utility until the development of a special polymerase enzyme, capable of copying XNA from a DNA template as well as copying XNA back into DNA. Pinheiro et al. (2012) have demonstrated an XNA-capable polymerase that works on sequences of around 100 base pairs in length. More recently, synthetic biologists Philipp Holliger and Alexander Taylor succeeded in creating XNAzymes, the XNA equivalent of a ribozyme, enzymes made of RNA. This demonstrates that XNAs can not only store hereditary information, but can also serve as enzymes, raising the possibility that life elsewhere could have begun with something other than RNA or DNA.

== Structure ==
Endogenous nucleic acids (DNA and RNA) are polymers composed of nucleotides. Each nucleotide consists of three chemical components: a phosphate, a five-carbon sugar group (which can be either a deoxyribose in DNA or a ribose in RNA), and one of five standard bases (adenine, guanine, cytosine, thymine, or uracil). Xenonucleic acids substitute the sugar components with a non-natural alternative. These substitutions make XNAs functionally and structurally analogous to DNA and RNA, despite not appearing in nature.

Some XNA types substitute the ribose or deoxyribose for another sugar or sugar derivative. Examples include:

- 2'-O-methyl-substituted RNA
- Threose nucleic acid (TNA)
- Locked nucleic acid (LNA)
- Bridged nucleic acid (BNA)
- 1,5-Anhydrohexitol nucleic acid (HNA)
- Fluoroarabino nucleic acid (FANA)

Some examples of XNA.

Others substitute a non-sugar unit. Examples include:

- Peptide nucleic acid (PNA)
- Glycol nucleic acid (GNA)
- Morpholino nucleic acid
- Cyclohexene nucleic acid (CeNA)

== Synthesis ==
XNA monomers are prepared by chemical synthesis and can be formed into XNA polymers using chemical synthesis or biosynthetic techniques.

=== Monomer synthesis ===
Appropriately protected monomers are required for chemical synthesis of XNA polymers. XNA nucleotides, or triphosphates are required for enzymatic polymerisation.

Typically, for sugar-based XNAs, to synthesize the xeno nucleoside, the 5 carbon sugar analog is chemically synthesised first. Then, the nucelobase is attached. To chemically synthesize the XNA oligomer from polymerization of xeno nucleoside, the hydroxyl group corresponding to 5'-OH of 5 carbon sugar needs activation by adding an active group (like MMTr, or monomethoxytrityl), then the activated xeno nucleosides can be attached in polymerization designated chemically. One typical example is CeNA, where the xeno nucleoside repeating units 2′-Cyclohexenylnucleosides are chemically synthesized by attaching the protected base to the protected cyclohexenyl precursor.

XNA with a similar chemical structure like DNA can be synthesized by engineered polymerases. HNA, CeNA, LNA/BNA, ANA/FANA, and TNA is suitable for this process, while the Spiegelmers(consists of L-nucleic acids) is suitable for engineered polymerases to synthesize.

=== Polymer synthesis ===
Solid-phase synthesis is an important technique for synthesis of short XNA sequences. This enables synthesis of defined sequences.

Alternatively, XNAs can be assembled enzymatically. As xeno nucleotides are analogs of nucleotides, they have a phosphate group attached to the corresponding hydroxyl group. Xeno nucleotides can be chemically treated to attach the phosphate group. Since the similarity between xeno nucleotides and natural nucleotides, the xeno nucleotides can be used as blocks of the engineered polymerases to synthesize the XNA.

Biosynthesis of the XNAs usually requires templates like the DNA replication, and this process requires the XNA to be structurally similar to natural nucleotide. XNA can be bio-synthesized with DNA templates, where the information in DNA templates instructs the XNA synthesis. XNA can also be bio-synthesized with XNA templates in some condition, where the XNA behaves like DNA. The synthesis of DNA molecule of XNA templates are also important. Special engineered polymerases and some reverse transcriptase are utilized in the DNA-to-XNA, XNA-to-XNA, and XNA-to-DNA synthesis.

- 1,5-Anhydrohexitol Nucleic Acid (HNA) bio-synthesis: HNA polymerases(like TgoT_6G12, which is archaeal polymerase from Thermococcus gorgonarius) have been engineered to synthesize HNA polymers.
- Cyclohexene Nucleic Acid (CeNA) and 2-F-CeNA bio-synthesis: Vent (exo−) DNA polymerase from the B-family polymerases, Taq DNA polymerase from the A-family polymerases, and HIV reverse transcriptase from the reverse transcriptase family have been developed to facilitate the synthesis of CeNA, enabling its use in synthetic genetics.
- Locked Nucleic Acid (LNA) / Bridged Nucleic Acid (BNA) bio-synthesis: These nucleic acids are synthesized through the engineering of polymerases that can accommodate their unique structural features, which include modifications that lock the nucleic acid structure. KOD DNA polymerases, a family B DNA polymerase derived from Thermococcus kodakarensis KOD1, are effective LNA decoders and encoders.
- Threofuranosyl Nucleic Acid (TNA) bio-synthesis: TNA has been synthesized using mutants of archaeal DNA polymerases, such as Kod-RI, Tgo and Therminator DNA polymerases (9°N, A485L).
- Arabino-Nucleic Acid (ANA)/2′-Fluoro-Arabinonucleic Acid (FANA) bio-synthesis: ANA/FANA is synthesized using engineered polymerases that can handle its specific backbone chemistry.
- Spiegelmers bio-synthesis: Spiegelmers are created by selecting RNA or DNA aptamers against enantiomeric target molecules, followed by the chemical synthesis of their non-natural L-RNA or L-DNA isomers. This process involves preparing mirror-image targets through chemical synthesis, which can be challenging.

== Implications ==
The study of XNAs is not intended to give scientists a better understanding of biological evolution as it has occurred historically, but rather to explore ways in which humans might control and reprogram the genetic makeup of biological organisms in future. XNA has shown significant potential in solving the current issue of genetic pollution in genetically modified organisms. While DNA is incredibly efficient in its ability to store genetic information and lend complex biological diversity, its four-letter genetic alphabet is relatively limited. Using a genetic code of six XNAs rather than the four naturally occurring DNA nucleotide bases yields greater opportunities for genetic modification and expansion of chemical functionality.

The development of various hypotheses and theories about XNAs have altered a key factor in the current understanding of nucleic acids: heredity and evolution are not limited to DNA and RNA as once thought, but are processes that have developed from polymers capable of storing information. Further investigations into XNAs will allow researchers to assess whether DNAs and RNAs are the most efficient and desirable building blocks of life, or if these two molecules emerged randomly after evolving from a larger class of chemical ancestors.

== Applications ==
=== Pharmaceuticals ===
XNAs are being researched for use in medicine, as XNAs may be able to serve as a more durable counterpart to the DNA and RNA-based treatment methodologies that are currently in use.

HNA (1,5-Anhydrohexitol nucleic acid) could potentially be used as a drug that can recognize and bind to specified sequences. Scientists have been able to isolate HNAs for the possible binding of sequences that target HIV.

Research has also shown that CeNAs (cyclohexene nucleic acid) with stereochemistry similar to DNAs can create stable duplexes with itself and RNAs. However, it was shown that CeNAs are not as stable when they form duplexes with DNA.

As genetic research continues on XNAs, various questions have come into consideration regarding biosafety, biosecurity, ethics, and governance/regulation. A key question is whether XNA in an in vivo setting would intermix with DNA and RNA in its natural environment, thereby rendering scientists unable to control or predict its implications in genetic mutation.

=== Other applications ===
XNAs also has potential applications to be used as catalysts, much like how RNA has the ability to be used as an enzyme. Researchers have shown XNA is able to cleave and ligate DNA, RNA and other XNA sequences, with the most activity being XNA catalyzed reactions on XNA molecules. This research may be used in determining whether DNA and RNA's role in life emerged through natural selection processes or if it was simply a coincidental occurrence.

One experiment conducted at the University of Florida led to the production of an XNA aptamer by the AEGIS-SELEX (artificially expanded genetic information system - systematic evolution of ligands by exponential enrichment) method, followed by successful binding to a line of breast cancer cells. Furthermore, experiments in the model bacterium E. coli have demonstrated the ability for XNA to serve as a biological template for DNA in vivo.

XNA may be employed as molecular clamps in quantitative real-time polymerase chain reactions (qPCR) by hybridizing with target DNA sequences. In a study published in PLOS ONE, an XNA-mediated molecular clamping assay detected mutant cell-free DNA (cfDNA) from precancerous colorectal cancer (CRC) lesions and colorectal cancer. XNAs may additionally act as highly specific molecular probes for detection of nucleic acid target sequence.

== See also ==
- Aptamer
