= Biological dark matter =

Unclassified/poorly understood genetics

Biological dark matter is an informal term for unclassified or poorly understood genetic material. This genetic material may refer to genetic material produced by unclassified microorganisms. By extension, biological dark matter may also refer to the un-isolated microorganisms whose existence can only be inferred from the genetic material that they produce. Some of the genetic material may not fall under the three existing domains of life: Bacteria, Archaea and Eukaryota; thus, it has been suggested that a possible fourth domain of life may yet be discovered, although other explanations are also probable. Alternatively, the genetic material may refer to non-coding DNA (so-called "junk DNA") and non-coding RNA produced by known organisms.

== Genomic dark matter ==
Much of the genomic dark matter is thought to originate from ancient transposable elements and from other low-complexity repetitive elements. Uncategorized genetic material is found in humans and many other species. Their phylogenetic novelty could indicate the cellular organisms or viruses from which they evolved.

== Unclassified microorganisms ==
Up to 99% of all living microorganisms cannot be cultured, so few functional insights exist about the metabolic potential of these organisms.

Sequences that are believed to be derived from unknown microbes are referred to as the microbial dark matter, the dark virome, or dark matter fungi. Such sequences are not rare. It has been estimated that in material from humans, between 40 and 90% of viral sequences are from dark matter. Human blood contains over three thousand different DNA sequences which cannot yet be identified. A mycological study from 2023 found that dark matter fungi seem to dominate the fungal kingdom.

Algorithms have been developed that examine sequences for similarities to bacterial 16S RNA sequences, K-mer similarities to known viruses, specific features of codon usage, or for inferring the existence of proteins. These approaches have suggested, for example, the existence of a novel bacteriophage of the microviridae family, and a novel bacterioidales-like phage. Other studies have suggested the existence of 264 new viral genera, discovered in publicly available databases, and a study of human blood suggested that 42% of people have at least one previously unknown virus each, adding up to 19 different new genera. A comprehensive study of DNA sequences from multiple human samples inferred the existence of 4,930 species of microbes of which 77% were previously unreported. Health-related findings include a prophage that might be associated with cirrhosis of the liver, and seven novel sequences from children with type-1 diabetes that have characteristics of viruses. Although they might exist, no organisms that clearly cause human disease have been discovered in the dark matter.

In February 2023, scientists reported the findings of unusual DNA strands from the microorganisms in the "dark microbiome" in the Atacama Desert, the driest non-polar desert on Earth.

== See also ==
- List of unsolved problems in biology – Biological concepts and questions with insufficient resolutions
- Microbial dark matter – Microbiological non-culture dependent methods
- Microbiological culture – Method of allowing microorganisms to multiply in a controlled medium
- Microbiome – Microbial community assemblage and activity
- Shadow biosphere – Hypothetical biosphere of Earth
- Taxonomy – Science of classifying organisms
- Xenobiology – Science of synthetic life forms
