= What Is Life (disambiguation) =

"What Is Life" is a 1970 song by George Harrison, later covered by Olivia Newton-John.

What Is Life may also refer to:

- "What Is Life?" (Black Uhuru song), a song from the 1984 album Anthem
- What Is Life?, a 1944 book by physicist Erwin Schrödinger
- What Is Life?, a 1947 book by evolutionary biologist J. B. S. Haldane
- What Is Life (to me without thee), a translation of Gluck's Che Faro Senza Euridice from his 1762 opera Orfeo ed Euridice
- "What is Life?" (Adventure Time), 15th episode of American animated television series Adventure Time season 1
- What Is Life? (album), 2021 by Brett Kissel
- What is Life?, 2023 album by Dax

== See also ==
- Definition of life
- Life
- Meaning of life
