= Microbial dark matter =

Microbiological non-culture dependent methods

Microbial dark matter (MDM) comprises the vast majority of microbial organisms (usually bacteria and archaea) that microbiologists are unable to culture in the laboratory (such as fastidious microorganisms), due to lack of knowledge or ability to supply the required growth conditions.

Microbial dark matter is analogous to the dark matter of physics and cosmology due to its elusiveness in research and importance to our understanding of biological diversity. Microbial dark matter can be found ubiquitously and abundantly across multiple ecosystems, but remains challenging to study due to difficulties in detecting and culturing these species. It was previously proposed that as little as one percent of microbes in a given ecological niche are culturable, but this estimate has been debated. The estimated proportion of unculturable microbes varies based on ecological niche and measurement techniques.

In recent years, more effort has been directed towards deciphering microbial dark matter by means of recovering genomic DNA sequences from environmental samples via culture independent methods such as single cell genomics and metagenomics. These studies have enabled insights into the evolutionary history and the metabolism of the sequenced genomes, providing valuable knowledge required for the cultivation of microbial dark matter lineages. Other methods like culturomics have been developed to learn how to culture microbial dark matter alongside techniques like gene sequencing to identify species of previously undiscovered microbes. However, microbial dark matter research remains comparatively undeveloped and is hypothesized to provide insight into processes radically different from known biology, new understandings of microbial communities, and increasing understanding of how life survives in extreme environments.

Many members of the microbial dark matter have a wide diversity of habitats, ways of surviving and thriving in those habitats, and even novel products made through biochemical pathways. This diversity includes microbes that live in very harsh environments, work together to support survival of the population, and even make new antibiotics to compete with other microbes.

== History of the term ==
Our contemporary understanding of microbial dark matter was born from a field that still faced constraints with the cultivation of traditional microbes. One of the main constraints of this time was an over dependence on the use of culturing methods. This over reliance meant that a large amount of microbial diversity remained yet to be discovered. However in the late 20th century new developments in molecular techniques led to a surge in discovery of uncultured microbes. Despite this newfound diversity, a large majority of microbial species remain uncharacterized. This fact was further proven by the development of advanced genomic sequencing techniques in the early 21st century which uncovered a larger amount of microbial diversity than previously thought.

== Study methods ==
=== Metagenomics ===
Metagenomics is a technique in the field of microbial studies that enables us to sequence DNA directly from samples of microbial environments. This method allows us to identify the genetic material of unknown microbes and avoid overreliance on the use of culturing. The use of metagenomics differs from other microbial methods in that it uses a broad description through its use of bulk samples. This technique has expanded our understanding of microbial functions in ecosystems through the discovery of new genes and metabolic pathways.

=== Single-cell genomics ===
Methods of single-cell genomics have shown promise in supporting metagenomics approaches by allowing the study of individual microbial cells isolated from their natural environments, a method which has been employed to uncover the genomic and functional diversity within microbial communities, particularly those that cannot be cultured. Single-cell techniques have also successfully identified numerous new branches on the tree of life, providing insight into the gaps of current phylogenetic understanding and metabolic potential of these organisms.

=== Improved culturing techniques ===
Despite the rise of culture-independent methods as successful methods for dark matter research, improvements in culturing techniques remain both relevant and necessary to further current understanding of MRM microbes. To this point, developments in methods such as highly specific growth media to mimic natural microbial environments and co-culturing of synergistic microbial species have shown success in studying previously unculturable microbes. These advancements also serve to facilitate the application of MRM research into biotechnological and physiological uses.

=== Computational tools ===
Genomic studies produce vast amounts of data to be analyzed. This analysis requires the use of advanced computational components. The scientific subdiscipline of bioinformatics used computational technology to collect genomes and conduct analysis on metabolic pathways. In recent years, research on artificial intelligence and machine learning has produced new ways to increase our ability to predict the behavior of microbial species using their genetic data. Metagenome-assembled genomes (MAGs) are one example of the emerging technology, which from the combined genomic material of diverse microbial communities group assembled DNA sequence fragments; enabling the reconstruction of genomes by using computational binning methods.

=== Culturomics ===
Limitations imposed by both culture-independent methods and traditional culturing methods have caused the rise of a new strategy to improve recovery and identification of microbial dark matter. Culturomics aims to create environments that simulate the natural conditions in which microbes can be found so they can be isolated, identified, and analyzed. Culturomics relies on high-throughput culture conditions varying in media, pH, temperature, and atmospheric conditions to enable the culturing and isolation of large and diverse samples simultaneously. This is used in conjunction with matrix-assisted laser desorption mass spectrometry (MALDI-ToF) for identification of isolated species. This can be assisted by 16S rRNA gene sequencing in order for further taxonomic identification if needed. Culturomics has already yielded significant results in culturing microbial dark matter, with a singular study resulting in the discovery of 31 new bacterial species and genera, as well as a total of 416 previously unculturable phylotypes identified.

=== Isolation chip (IChip) ===
The isolation chip (IChip) is a relatively new technology that allows for a method of culturing previously uncultivable microorganisms. IChip is unique due to its ability to keep bacteria in their natural environment by bringing the environment to the lab using in situ cultivation techniques. This is done by growing and isolating microorganisms by placing individual cells into small diffusion chambers; a semipermeable membrane encloses the chambers, allowing nutrients and important environmental factors from the natural environment to diffuse into them without cell movement. Later developments have improved IChip by integrating techniques like fluorescence-activated cell sorting (FACS); this allows higher precision of single-cell isolation through sorting individual cells directly into wells. FACS-iChip has shown promising results in achieving substantially higher culture recovery rates compared to traditional methods.

== Microbes with highly unusual DNA ==
It has been suggested that certain microbial dark matter genetic material could belong to a new (i.e., fourth) domain of life, although other explanations (e.g., viral origin) are also possible, which has ties with the issue of a hypothetical shadow biosphere.

== Diversity ==
=== Extremophiles ===
Molecular markers and sequencing techniques have played a key role in the discovery of extremophiles and expanded the study of microbial dark matter. Many members of the microbial dark matter remain unculturable due either to their preference or requirement to grow in harsh, extreme environments, and it is likely that a vast majority have unique adaptations to living in these environments.

One member of the extremophiles, known as acidophiles, thrive in acidic, low-pH conditions. In addition to acidic conditions, acidophiles are also capable of surviving in environments with increased levels of heavy metals, temperature, chloride-related stressors, and/or osmotic stress. One major adaptation that acidophiles have made is the ability to gain energy through the oxidation of sulfur in their environment by creating sulfur oxidoreductase enzymes.

Halophiles, which are bacteria, archaea, and some fungi that thrive in environments of very high salt concentrations, seem to have a unique strategy that involves building up salts and solutes from their environments within the cell itself, which helps to maintain osmotic pressure. This helps protect the halophiles from drying out (desiccation), and from the cell shrinking due to the desiccation of the cytoplasm.

== Marine organisms ==
=== Marinilabilias salmonicolor ===
This specific bacterial strain out of 12 other Marinilaiblias was retrieved by a short chain fatty acid methods, noting a long dormant nature of the bacteria to grow. Combining different shorty fatty acids can influence in shorting the lag phase, depending on the tested on different media. In 5th day of growing, the cells won't reproduce and instead would remain as dormant with or without with fatty acids as a nutrient under anaerobic conditions. There is no growth in the 5 day period it's observed that colonies, however the bacterium have a sudden rapid phase of reproducing in the 12th day. This sudden grown is with or without shorty acids nutrients. Even with the cells being dormant, they are still alive being stained with SYTO 9 red dye. It's noted the state of dormancy in the media is came into the influence of cryogenic oligotrophic stress. In 4C the specific strain can stop growing in 7 days in low temperature stress. Recent meta-transcriptomic data has shown this specific strain a change metabolic ranging into lows and highs noted in Marinilaiblias. Storing for Marinilabilias salmonicolor strain is observed to be in 4C for 98 days, triggering to enter into a viable but nonculturable response.

=== MK-D1 ===
Coming from the archaea family, this organism was detected through 16S rRNA primers and the iTAG analysis. The organism growing along side with anaerobic organisms specifically in the Halodesulfovibrio and Methanogenium genera. Both of the genera influence the growth of MK-D1, without them it can't grow alone without its partners. Most of the nutrient that MK-D1 uses is an exchange with amino acids or peptides, with both of the genera partners to trade with hydrogen and formate. It utilizes syntropic partners to co-exist together in anerobic environments. If there is a low abundance of Halodesulfovibrio, MK-D1 then it switches into partnering with Mathanogenium as a source of nutrients. The double time of MK-D1 ranges around 14-25 days, and vary with how much the other organisms use there energy sources and growth rate. A pure culture takes around 12 years to form, due the maximum of length of time needed to grow.

=== Symbionts ===
Through fairly recent metagenomic studies, it has been shown that many unculturable organisms may participate in symbiotic relationships with other living things in their environment, relying on one another to survive. One such example of unculturable microbes acting in symbiosis comes from microbes that live in radioactive environments, wherein they make peroxidases to prevent highly reactive oxygen molecules from damaging themselves and other microbes in the environment, thus mutually protecting each other. Some acidophiles may even encode for necessary metabolic pathways for other members of its genus, performing things like glycolysis and oxidation for other acidophiles.

=== Metabolic products ===
Members of the microbial dark matter group seem to have notably unique biochemical pathways, allowing for the creation of many new products, such as antibiotics, enzymes, and more. A notable example of a unique metabolic product from an uncultured organism is teixobactin, which seems to be a new class of antibiotic that may have wide-spectrum effects against many bacteria. As with the symbionts mentioned before, other metabolic products are used by microbial dark matter to combat reactive radical oxygen species, such as peroxidases and other general antioxidants. Many more unique metabolic products are likely to be found as more members of the microbial dark matter continue to be sequenced and studied, despite the difficulty in studying their genomes and their lack of cultivability.

- Biological dark matter
- Microbial ecology
- Microbiology
