= Definition of life =

Common characteristics of all life

The precise definition of life is contested, and several proposals have been advanced. Biology defines and studies life on Earth, but abiogenesis and astrobiology seek wider and more encompassing definitions. Abiogenesis is the process by which life develops from inorganic materials, so a definition aims to establish the frontier between inorganic matter and the earliest lifeforms. Astrobiology seeks extraterrestrial life, which may differ from life on Earth.

== Common features ==
The characteristics of life

Life does not have a simple definition, because life on Earth has a huge diversity, ranging from microscopic microorganisms to massive plants and trees, and in all sorts of habitats. A common way to define life is by using a number of characteristics that should be common to all life forms. However, those characteristics are not universal, and there are exceptions and possible false positives with all of them. The main ones include:

- Order: The elements that make up life are not randomly distributed. There is a biological organisation at all levels of life, from the microscopic cell to a full organism and even to the groups of several organisms. However, order is a necessary but not sufficient condition for life, as other structures like crystal rocks are also capable of displaying order. At the atomic level, atoms and molecules have order, but they are not considered to be alive, only to be the building blocks of life.
- Reproduction: Living organisms are capable of reproduction, a process where an individual organism can create a new, independent organism that is almost similar to the original. Cells reproduce by splitting, larger organisms may use more complex processes such as sexual reproduction. Hybrids like mules and individuals incapable of reproduction as a result of infertility or other diseases are not considered exceptions, as they were born by the reproduction of other individuals. Reproduction may likely be a universal trait of life, as it allows life to persist despite the eventual death of individuals.
- Growth: All living organism grow and develop during part or all of their life cycle. This follows patterns directed at least in part by heredity. However, growth alone is not enough to define life, as fire can grow but is not alive.
- Homeostasis: All Earth lifeforms use energy for their internal work, and it is unlikely for any potential extraterrestrial life to be different about that. From a physical point of view, a lifeform is a thermodynamic system, and the second law of thermodynamics means that if left alone it would gradually lose its internal energy, leading to increased disorder within its components, causing its biological death. To avoid that, the lifeform requires a frequent source of energy. Usually it is food, matter that is transformed by the lifeform's internal biology into usable energy, in line with the first law of thermodynamics. In turn, the environment needs an external source of energy (such as sunlight or the planet's internal heat) so that the lifeforms do not deplete the free energy. It is unlikely that life can exist long-term without such a source of energy.
- Interaction with the environment: All lifeforms react in some way to certain stimulus, changes in the environment. Plants may grow in the direction of sunlight as a result of phototropism to aid their photosynthesis, and animals may leave cold areas for warmer ones to keep their internal heat within acceptable levels.
- Evolution: Living organisms interact with their environment, and with other organisms, both from their same species and from others. Evolution is a process that makes new organisms, generated by reproduction, to be better suited for those interactions.

Trivial definitions of life, such as those used in dictionaries and science divulgation, rely on several aspects that should take place in it, such as homeostasis, growth, reproduction, and death. Biology, however, provides a more reliable answer: all lifeforms on Earth are composed of cells (both unicellular and multicellular lifeforms), and reproduction replicates information from an ancestor into its offspring with the work of the DNA and the RNA. All lifeforms on Earth have this in common, and nothing that does not live does. It is, thus, a perfect working definition for most sciences. However, it is an incomplete definition for abiogenesis, the science that studies the origin of life. Earth began completely lifeless, and by some unclear chemistry inorganic materials combined themselves and created life. But life as we know it is too complex to appear abruptly, the process must have had steps, and we would require a better definition of life to decide which of those steps can be considered lifeforms, even if more primitive. As for astrobiology, all lifeforms known to us are from a single planet. Life in other planets may have developed in other ways, and we would need a broader definition that would cover such divergent lifeforms as well.

== Problems ==
A problem with defining life by a number of characteristics is that it can provide false positives. Long and detailed lists leave potential lifeforms out, and small lists may include things that were not intended to be considered alive. For example, crystals can grow and tend towards equilibrium, as organisms can do using homeostasis, but are not alive. On the other hand, many organisms such as slime moulds and tardigrades enter into dormant stages where their metabolism comes to a halt as a results of cryptobiosis, yet they remain alive. Robert Saphiro and Gerald Feinberg proposed that life is the activity of a biosphere, defining biosphere as "a highly ordered system of matter and energy characterized by complex cycles that maintain or gradually increase the order of the system through the exchange of energy with the environment"; a definition that may be too broad. There are four possible ways to organize a definition. The first one is that there are a number of features and all of them must apply for something to be alive; if something has only some features but not others, then it is not. This is the method used by divulgation outlets. The second is that there is a single necessary and sufficient condition that can define the presence or absence of life. The third is that there are several necessary and sufficient conditions that define life; this is the one used in science. And finally, there may be several types of life without a common characteristic between them all.

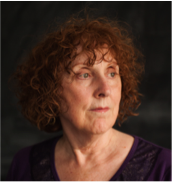
Carol Cleland proposes a general theory of living systems.

The astrobiologist Carol Cleland considers that the problem is caused by the vagueness of spoken language, and that science does not need a definition of life, but rather a general theory of living systems. She compares the problems defining life with the problems defining substances in the Middle Ages, before the discovery of molecules, and points out that nitric acid was considered a type of water back then because it shared some superficial properties. However, a general theory can not be formulated before a sample of extraterrestrial life can be found and studied. At this point, there is not enough data to formulate such a theory, as it is unknown if life is abundant in the universe or just a rarity exclusive of Earth.

Life on Earth is carbon-based life, and uses water as a solvent. It is often assumed that life in other planets may have a similar composition, disregarding hypothetical types of biochemistry. Scientist Carl Sagan defined it as "carbon chauvinism". However, as those lifeforms are only theoretical, the details of their metabolism are unknown and it would be complex to define what to seek when seeking such lifeforms. However, although it is accepted that life can be composed of substances other than carbon and water, their properties still make them the better ones suited for it.

NASA defines life as a "self-sustaining chemical reaction capable of Darwinian evolution". Adaptation works with natural selection, but it is unclear if human beings are still subject to it. In nature unfit creatures would not reproduce and would not pass their genes to later beings, ensuring that only the best individuals did so, but human beings are capable of compassion and to practice medicine, which may negate the process. And it's hard to test a being and detect if it's capable of evolution, as evolution takes place in the species over time and not in specific individuals. It is also unclear if Darwinian evolution is a feature of all life, or just a characteristic of life on Earth. However, no credible alternative to it has been formulated. Evolution can also find false-positives such as computer virus coded with evolutionary algorithms. Evolution does not explain either the origin of life, which is understood to be the result of abiogenesis, a chemical evolution rather than a biological one. It is still unclear if it would be possible to recognize the first organism capable of evolution: some scientists think that had to be a clear first living organism, and others that it would be a slow process with several stages.

=== Viruses ===
Viruses pose a challenge to the formulation of a definition of life, because of their unique system of reproduction. They are incapable of reproduction on their own, but they can reproduce by infecting a living cell and exploiting its reproduction for their own benefit. As a result, they are considered a borderline case, in the frontier between the living and non-living. Prions, abnormal protein molecules, are another borderline case, as they are also incapable of reproduction, but can infect other proteins and turn them into prions. Meaning, they don't make copies of themselves, but they increase their numbers by turning others. They are usually considered non-living, although they present some ambiguity.

== History ==
=== Aristotle ===
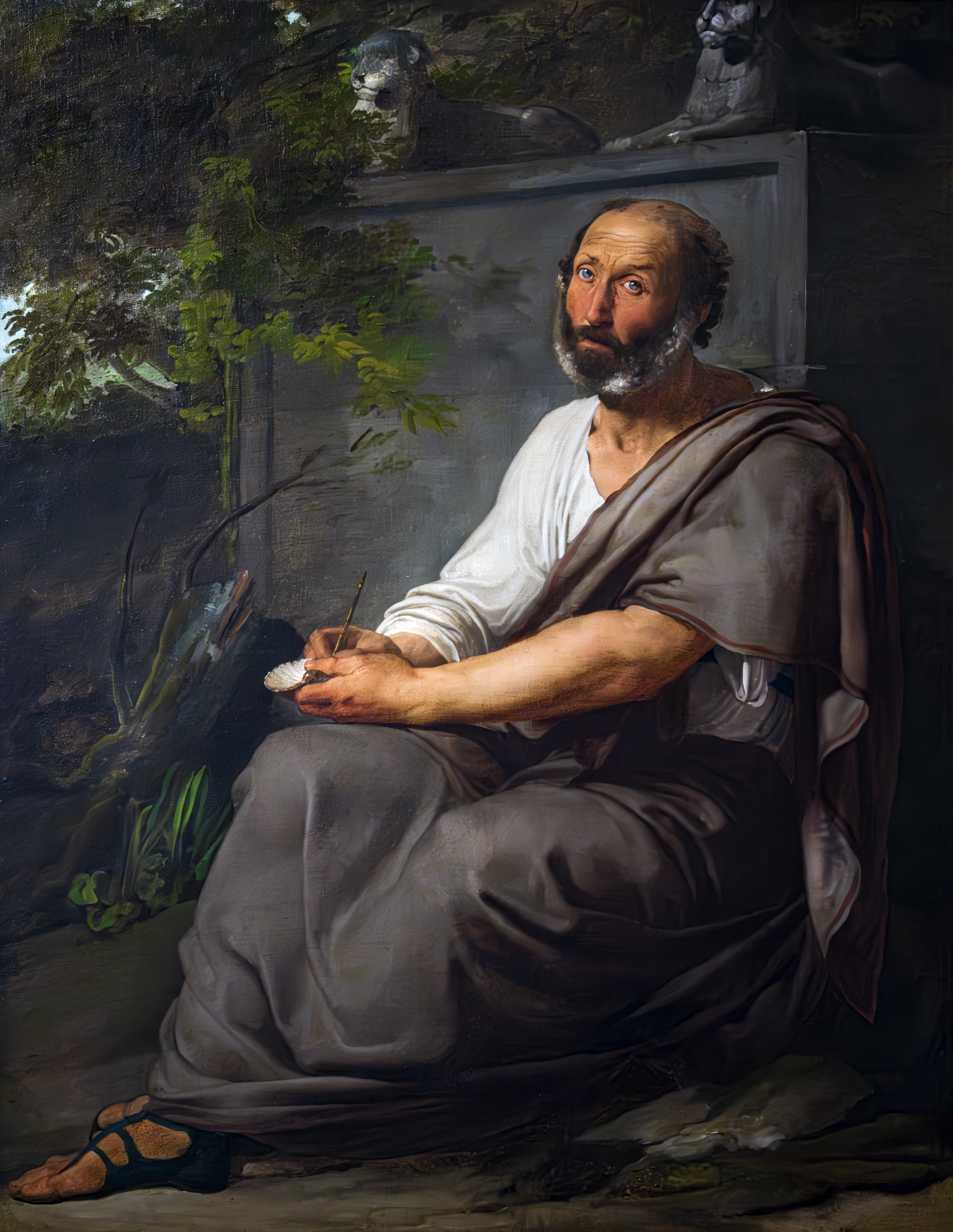
Aristotle was the first to try to formulate a comprehensive definition of life.

Aristotle emphasized that theory should be based on empirical investigations. He studied animal life by observation, experimentation, and dissection. He distinguished living things by their ability to use food, reproduce, perceive, move, and think. He compared the structure and actions of a living thing to the blueprints and tools used to build a house, as everything is prearranged to reach a desired end state. He noted that a house does not get built or maintained by itself and requires actual planning and work by humans, whereas living organisms build and regenerate themselves. This was difficult to reconcile with a mechanistic conception of causation, so he postulated a special form of natural causation, the "soul", that allows living things to be self-causing. He posited four types of causation: efficient, material, formal, and final. The concept of a soul allows animals to have final causations without an external guiding hand.

=== Mechanism to vitalism ===
Aristotelianism was questioned in the 1630s by René Descartes in Treatise on Man, which described living beings as automata, built on muscles, bones, and organs instead of cogs and pistons. Shortly afterwards Isaac Newton postulated the three laws of motion, and final causation was no longer considered valid. However, as the knowledge about plants and animals grew, it soon became clear that their working was fundamentally different to that of artificial machines. Scientists proposed vitalism to explain that a "vital force" made living organisms work.

In the 18th century, Immanuel Kant said that living organisms are built with a design, but as nature lacks a designer, it could only mean that living beings are naturally teleological and incapable of being explained purely by a framework of forces like Newton's laws of motion.

=== Emergentism ===
In 1828, Friedrich Wöhler synthesised urea, plainly a chemical of life, launching the discipline of organic chemistry. This supported the view that life was built out of chemical reactions. This philosophical viewpoint, later called emergentism, rejected vitalism. It proposed instead that living matter is composed by the same basic physical stuff as non-living matter, and is subject to the laws of physics. As matter organization grows, it generates new properties and patterns that can not be explained at the level of physics.

In 1859, Charles Darwin published his book On the Origin of Species. It argued in its closing paragraph that "There is grandeur in this view of life, with its several powers, having been originally breathed into a few forms or into one", and that "endless forms most beautiful and most wonderful have been, and are being, evolved." He intentionally avoided the question of the origin of life, but assumed that life could have emerged from non-living matter. More recently, scientists have come to see both life and the origin of life as processes governed by the laws of chemistry.

== Bibliography ==
- Aguilera Mochón, Juan Antonio (2016). La vida no terrestre: estamos solos en el universo? [Non-terrestrial life: are we alone in the universe?] (in Spanish). Spain: RBA. ISBN 978-84-473-8665-9.
- Bennett, Jeffrey (2017). Life in the universe. United States: Pearson. pp. 3–4. ISBN 978-0-13-408908-9.
- Cleland, Carol (2019). The quest for a universal theory of life. Cambridge University Press. ISBN 978-0-521-87324-6.
