= Nucleic acid =

Class of large biomolecules essential to all known life

Nucleic acids RNA (left) and DNA (right).

Nucleic acids are large biomolecules that are crucial in all cells and viruses. They are composed of nucleotides, which are the monomer components: a 5-carbon sugar, a phosphate group and a nitrogenous base. The two main classes of nucleic acids are deoxyribonucleic acid (DNA) and ribonucleic acid (RNA). If the sugar is ribose, the polymer is RNA; if the sugar is deoxyribose, a variant of ribose, the polymer is DNA.

Nucleic acids are chemical compounds that are found in nature. They carry information in cells and make up genetic material. These acids are very common in all living things, where they create, encode, and store information in every living cell of every life-form on Earth. In turn, they send and express that information inside and outside the cell nucleus. From the inner workings of the cell to the young of a living thing, they contain and provide information via the nucleic acid sequence. This gives the RNA and DNA their unmistakable 'ladder-step' order of nucleotides within their molecules. Both play a crucial role in directing protein synthesis.

Strings of nucleotides are bonded to form spiraling backbones and assembled into chains of bases or base-pairs selected from the five primary, or canonical, nucleobases. RNA usually forms a chain of single bases, whereas DNA forms a chain of base pairs. The bases found in RNA and DNA are: adenine, cytosine, guanine, thymine, and uracil. Thymine occurs only in DNA and uracil only in RNA. Using amino acids and protein synthesis, the specific sequence in DNA of these nucleobase-pairs helps to keep and send coded instructions as genes. In RNA, base-pair sequencing helps to make new proteins that determine most chemical processes of all life forms.

== History ==
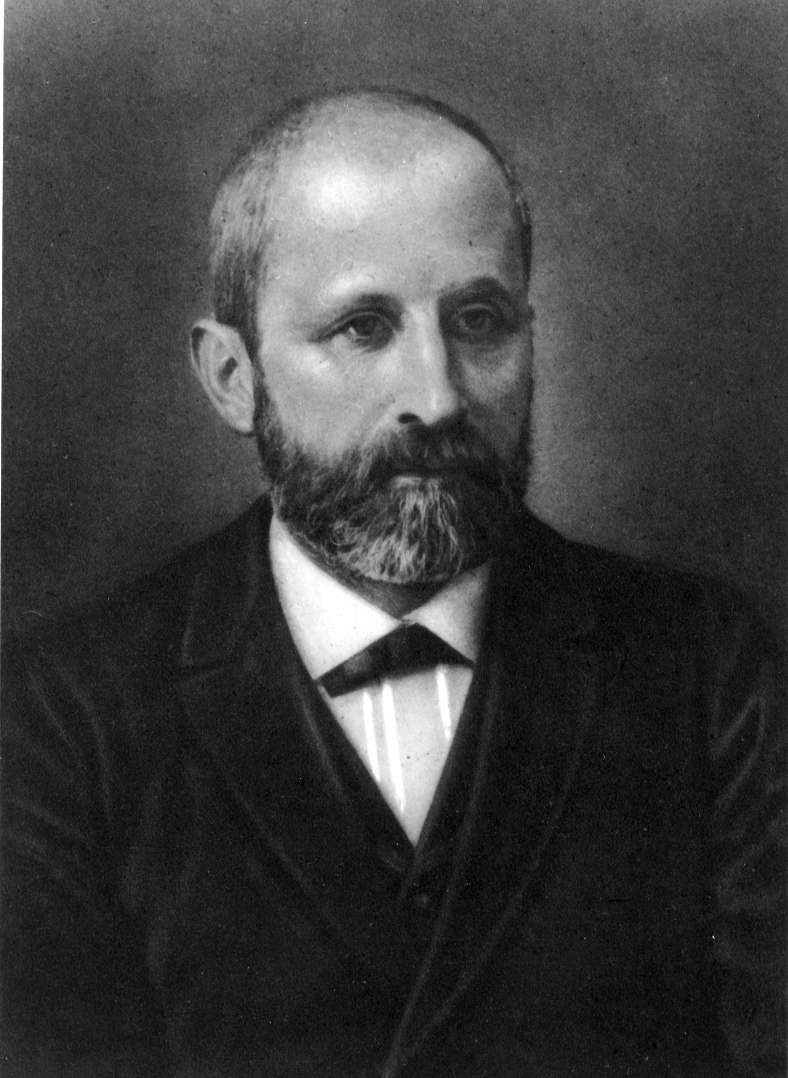
The Swiss scientist Friedrich Miescher discovered the "nuclein", in 1868. Later, he raised the idea that it could be involved in heredity.

Nucleic acid was, partially, first discovered by Friedrich Miescher in 1869 at the University of Tübingen, Germany. He discovered a new substance, which he called nuclein and which - depending on how his results are interpreted in detail - can be seen in modern terms either as a nucleic acid-histone complex or as the actual nucleic acid. Phoebus Levene determined the basic structure of nucleic acids. In the early 1880s, Albrecht Kossel further purified the nucleid acid substance and discovered its highly acidic properties. He later also identified the nucleobases. In 1889 Richard Altmann created the term nucleic acid – at that time DNA and RNA were not differentiated. In 1938 Astbury and Bell published the first X-ray diffraction pattern of DNA.

In 1944 the Avery–MacLeod–McCarty experiment showed that DNA is the carrier of genetic information and in 1953 Watson and Crick proposed the double-helix structure of DNA.

Experimental studies of nucleic acids constitute a major part of modern biological and medical research, and form a foundation for genome and forensic science, and the biotechnology and pharmaceutical industries.

== Occurrence and nomenclature ==
The term nucleic acid is the overall name for DNA and RNA, members of a family of biopolymers, and is a type of polynucleotide. Nucleic acids were named for their initial discovery within the nucleus, and for the presence of phosphate groups (related to phosphoric acid). Although first discovered within the nucleus of eukaryotic cells, nucleic acids are now known to be found in all life forms including within bacteria, archaea, mitochondria, chloroplasts, and viruses (There is debate as to whether viruses are living or non-living). All living cells contain both DNA and RNA (except some cells such as mature red blood cells), while viruses contain either DNA or RNA, but usually not both. The basic component of biological nucleic acids is the nucleotide, each of which contains a pentose sugar (ribose or deoxyribose), a phosphate group, and a nucleobase. Nucleic acids are also generated within the laboratory, through the use of enzymes (DNA and RNA polymerases) and by solid-phase chemical synthesis.

== Molecular composition and size ==
Nucleic acids are generally very large molecules. Indeed, DNA molecules are probably the largest individual molecules known. Well-studied biological nucleic acid molecules range in size from 21 nucleotides (small interfering RNA) to large chromosomes (human chromosome 1 is a single molecule that contains 247 million base pairs).

In most cases, naturally occurring DNA molecules are double-stranded and RNA molecules are single-stranded. There are numerous exceptions, however—some viruses have genomes made of double-stranded RNA and other viruses have single-stranded DNA genomes, and, in some circumstances, nucleic acid structures with three or four strands can form.

Nucleic acids are linear polymers (chains) of nucleotides. Each nucleotide consists of three components: a purine or pyrimidine nucleobase (sometimes termed nitrogenous base or simply base), a pentose sugar, and a phosphate group which makes the molecule acidic. The substructure consisting of a nucleobase plus sugar is termed a nucleoside. Nucleic acid types differ in the structure of the sugar in their nucleotides–DNA contains 2'-deoxyribose while RNA contains ribose (where the only difference is the presence of a hydroxyl group). Also, the nucleobases found in the two nucleic acid types are different: adenine, cytosine, and guanine are found in both RNA and DNA, while thymine occurs in DNA and uracil occurs in RNA.

The sugars and phosphates in nucleic acids are connected to each other in an alternating chain (sugar-phosphate backbone) through phosphodiester linkages. In conventional nomenclature, the carbons to which the phosphate groups attach are the 3'-end and the 5'-end carbons of the sugar. This gives nucleic acids directionality, and the ends of nucleic acid molecules are referred to as 5'-end and 3'-end. The nucleobases are joined to the sugars via an N-glycosidic linkage involving a nucleobase ring nitrogen (N-1 for pyrimidines and N-9 for purines) and the 1' carbon of the pentose sugar ring.

Non-standard nucleosides are also found in both RNA and DNA and usually arise from modification of the standard nucleosides within the DNA molecule or the primary (initial) RNA transcript. Transfer RNA (tRNA) molecules contain a particularly large number of modified nucleosides.

== Topology ==
Double-stranded nucleic acids are made up of complementary sequences, in which extensive Watson-Crick base pairing results in a highly repeated and quite uniform nucleic acid double-helical three-dimensional structure. In contrast, single-stranded RNA and DNA molecules are not constrained to a regular double helix, and can adopt highly complex three-dimensional structures that are based on short stretches of intramolecular base-paired sequences including both Watson-Crick and noncanonical base pairs, and a wide range of complex tertiary interactions.

Nucleic acid molecules are usually unbranched and may occur as linear and circular molecules. For example, bacterial chromosomes, plasmids, mitochondrial DNA, and chloroplast DNA are usually circular double-stranded DNA molecules, while chromosomes of the eukaryotic nucleus are usually linear double-stranded DNA molecules. Most RNA molecules are linear, single-stranded molecules, but both circular and branched molecules can result from RNA splicing reactions. The total amount of pyrimidines in a double-stranded DNA molecule is equal to the total amount of purines. The diameter of the helix is about 20 Å.

== Sequences ==
One DNA or RNA molecule differs from another primarily in the sequence of nucleotides. Nucleotide sequences are of great importance in biology since they carry the ultimate instructions that encode all biological molecules, molecular assemblies, subcellular and cellular structures, organs, and organisms, and directly enable cognition, memory, and behavior. Enormous efforts have gone into the development of experimental methods to determine the nucleotide sequence of biological DNA and RNA molecules, and today hundreds of millions of nucleotides are sequenced daily at genome centers and smaller laboratories worldwide. In addition to maintaining the GenBank nucleic acid sequence database, the National Center for Biotechnology Information (NCBI) provides analysis and retrieval resources for the data in GenBank and other biological data made available through the NCBI web site.

== Types ==
=== Deoxyribonucleic acid ===
Deoxyribonucleic acid (DNA) is a nucleic acid containing the genetic instructions used in the development and functioning of all known living organisms. The chemical DNA was discovered in 1869, but its role in genetic inheritance was not demonstrated until 1943. The DNA segments that carry this genetic information are called genes. Other DNA sequences have structural purposes, or are involved in regulating the use of this genetic information. Along with RNA and proteins, DNA is one of the three major macromolecules that are essential for all known forms of life.

DNA consists of two long polymers of monomer units called nucleotides, with backbones made of sugars and phosphate groups joined by ester bonds. These two strands are oriented in opposite directions to each other and are, therefore, antiparallel. Attached to each sugar is one of four types of molecules called nucleobases (informally, bases). It is the sequence of these four nucleobases along the backbone that encodes genetic information. This information specifies the sequence of the amino acids within proteins according to the genetic code. The code is read by copying stretches of DNA into the related nucleic acid RNA in a process called transcription. Within cells, DNA is organized into long sequences called chromosomes. During cell division these chromosomes are duplicated in the process of DNA replication, providing each cell its own complete set of chromosomes. Eukaryotic organisms (animals, plants, fungi, and protists) store most of their DNA inside the cell nucleus and some of their DNA in organelles, such as mitochondria or chloroplasts. In contrast, prokaryotes (bacteria and archaea) store their DNA only in the cytoplasm. Within the chromosomes, chromatin proteins such as histones compact and organize DNA. These compact structures guide the interactions between DNA and other proteins, helping control which parts of the DNA are transcribed.

=== Ribonucleic acid ===
Ribonucleic acid (RNA) functions in converting genetic information from genes into the amino acid sequences of proteins. The three universal types of RNA include transfer RNA (tRNA), messenger RNA (mRNA), and ribosomal RNA (rRNA). Messenger RNA acts to carry genetic sequence information between DNA and ribosomes, directing protein synthesis and carries instructions from DNA in the nucleus to ribosome . Ribosomal RNA reads the DNA sequence, and catalyzes peptide bond formation. Transfer RNA serves as the carrier molecule for amino acids to be used in protein synthesis, and is responsible for decoding the mRNA. In addition, many other classes of RNA are now known.

=== Artificial nucleic acid ===
Artificial nucleic acid analogues have been designed and synthesized. They include peptide nucleic acid, morpholino- and locked nucleic acid, glycol nucleic acid, and threose nucleic acid. Each of these is distinguished from naturally occurring DNA or RNA by changes to the backbone of the molecules.

== See also ==
- Comparison of nucleic acid simulation software
- History of biochemistry
- History of molecular biology
- History of RNA biology
- Molecular biology – Branch of biology that studies biological systems at the molecular level
- Nucleic acid methods – Techniques used to study nucleic acids
- Nucleic acid metabolism – Process
- Nucleic acid structure – Biomolecular structure of nucleic acids such as DNA and RNA
- Nucleic acid thermodynamics – Study of how temperature affects the nucleic acid structure
- Oligonucleotide synthesis – Chemical synthesis of nucleic acids
- Quantification of nucleic acids – Process in molecular biology

== Bibliography ==
- Wolfram Saenger, Principles of Nucleic Acid Structure, 1984, Springer-Verlag New York Inc.
- Bruce Alberts, Alexander Johnson, Julian Lewis, Martin Raff, Keith Roberts, and Peter Walter Molecular Biology of the Cell, 2007, ISBN 978-0-8153-4105-5. Fourth edition is available online through the NCBI Bookshelf: link
- Jeremy M Berg, John L Tymoczko, and Lubert Stryer, Biochemistry 5th edition, 2002, W H Freeman. Available online through the NCBI Bookshelf: link
- Astrid Sigel; Helmut Sigel; Roland K. O. Sigel, eds. (2012). Interplay between Metal Ions and Nucleic Acids. Metal Ions in Life Sciences. Vol. 10. Springer. doi:10.1007/978-94-007-2172-2. ISBN 978-94-007-2171-5. S2CID 92951134.
