= Evgeny Nudler =

American biochemist

- Known for: Molecular mechanisms of transcription elongation and termination, cellular adaptation to genotoxic and proteotoxic stress, riboswitches, RNA polymerase backtracking
- Scientific career
- Fields: Biochemistry
- Workplaces: New York University School of Medicine

Evgeny Nudler is an American biochemist, currently the Julie Wilson Anderson Professor at New York University School of Medicine. He is an investigator with the Howard Hughes Medical Institute and is best known for his pioneering work on the molecular mechanisms of transcription elongation and termination, mechanisms of cellular adaptation to genotoxic and proteotoxic stress, as well as his role in the discovery of riboswitches and RNA polymerase backtracking.

Nudler was born in Moscow and received his PhD in biochemistry from the Institute of Molecular Genetics, Russian Academy of Sciences. He performed his postdoctoral training at the Public Health Research Institute with Alexander Goldfarb. He was elected as a fellow of the American Academy of Arts and Sciences in 2017.
