= Threose nucleic acid =

Chemical compound

Comparison between the structures of DNA/RNA and TNA.

L-Threose is used as backbone sugar in threose nucleic acid (TNA) instead of the standard ribose used in RNA or deoxyribose used in DNA.

Threose nucleic acid (TNA) is an artificial genetic polymer in which the natural five-carbon ribose sugar found in RNA has been replaced by an unnatural four-carbon threose sugar. Invented by Albert Eschenmoser as part of his quest to explore the chemical etiology of RNA, TNA has become an important synthetic genetic polymer as a xeno nucleic acid (XNA) due to its ability to efficiently base pair with complementary sequences of DNA and RNA. The main difference between TNA and DNA/RNA is their backbones. DNA and RNA have their phosphate backbones linking the 5' of each sugar to the 3' position of the next whereas TNA links the 2' and 3' positions. Both sites are on the ring itself rather than a carbon extended beyond, and the stereochemical configuration at 3' is inverted. This modified backbone makes TNA, unlike DNA and RNA, completely refractory to nuclease digestion, making it a promising nucleic acid analog for therapeutic and diagnostic applications.

== Synthesis ==
TNA oligonucleotides were first constructed by automated solid-phase synthesis using phosphoramidite chemistry. Methods for chemically synthesized TNA monomers (phosphoramidites and nucleoside triphosphates) have been heavily optimized to support synthetic biology projects aimed at advancing TNA research.

=== TNA polymerases ===
More recently, polymerase engineering efforts have produced TNA polymerases that can copy genetic information back and forth between DNA and TNA. TNA replication occurs through a process that mimics RNA replication. In these systems, TNA is reverse transcribed into DNA, the DNA is amplified by the polymerase chain reaction, and then forward transcribed back into TNA.

The mechanism of TNA synthesis by a laboratory evolved TNA polymerase has been studied using X-ray crystallography to capture the five major steps of nucleotide addition. These structures demonstrate imperfect recognition of the incoming TNA nucleotide triphosphate and support the need for further directed evolution experiments to create TNA polymerases with improved activity. The binary structure of a TNA reverse transcriptase has also been solved by X-ray crystallography, revealing the importance of structural plasticity as a possible mechanism for template recognition.

== Significance ==
The availability of TNA polymerases have enabled the in vitro selection of biologically stable TNA aptamers to both small molecule and protein targets. Such experiments demonstrate that the properties of heredity and evolution are not limited to the natural genetic polymers of DNA and RNA. The high biological stability of TNA relative to other nucleic acid systems that are capable of undergoing Darwinian evolution, suggests that TNA is a strong candidate for the development of next-generation therapeutic aptamers.

=== Pre-DNA system ===
In the context of prebiotic synthesis, TNA could have been an early genetic system and a precursor to RNA. TNA is simpler than RNA and can be synthesized from a single starting material. TNA is able to transfer back and forth information with RNA and with strands of itself that are complementary to the RNA. TNA has been shown to fold into tertiary structures with discrete ligand-binding properties.

== See also ==
- Abiogenesis
- Glycol nucleic acid
- Oligonucleotide synthesis
- Peptide nucleic acid
- Xenobiology
