= Aptamer =

Oligonucleotide or peptide molecules that bind specific targets

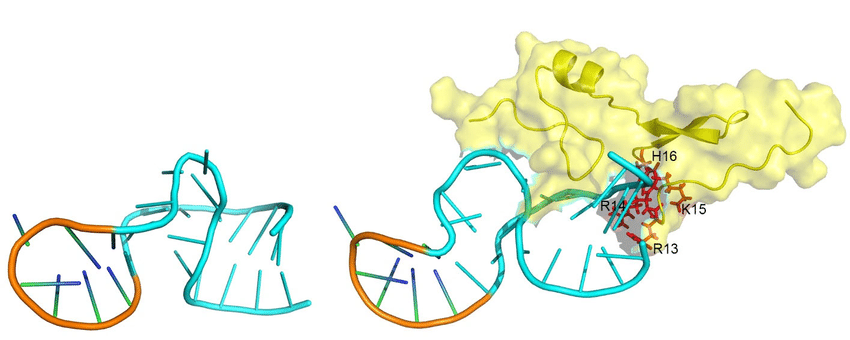
Left: Unbound aptamer. Right: the aptamer bound to its target protein. The protein is in yellow. Parts of the aptamer that change shape when it binds its target are in blue, while the unchanging parts are in orange. The parts of the aptamer that contact the protein are highlighted in red.

== Introduction ==
Aptamers are oligomers of artificial ssDNA, RNA, XNA, or peptide that bind a specific target molecule, or family of target molecules. They exhibit a range of affinities (K_{D} in the pM to μM range), with variable levels of off-target binding and are classified as chemical antibodies. Introduced by biochemists Ellington, Szostak, Tuerk, and Gold in 1990,aptamers can replace antibodies due to their ability to bind to target molecules with high binding affinity and specificity. By possessing unique tertiary structures, aptamers' binding can be further optimized through the selection process for better target recognition.

Aptamers and antibodies can be used in many of the same applications, but the nucleic acid-based structure of aptamers, which are mostly oligonucleotides, is very different from the amino acid-based structure of antibodies, which are proteins. This difference can make aptamers more suitable than antibodies for some purposes (see antibody replacement).

Aptamers are most commonly used in biological lab research and medical tests. If multiple aptamers are combined into a single assay, they can measure large numbers of different proteins in a sample. They can be used to identify molecular markers of disease, or can function as drugs, drug delivery systems and controlled drug release systems. They also find use in other molecular engineering tasks.

Aptamers are selected from a process known as Systematic Evolution of Ligands by Exponential Enrichment, or SELEX. The process starts with a library of oligonucleotides allowed to fold into 3D structures by annealing. Next, the library is incubated with the target molecule. After the binding of aptamers to their target, the bound and unbound aptamers are separated by washing.Aptamers with high binding affinities to their targets will stay bound, and those with low binding affinities will be washed out.The sequence of the bound aptamers will then be amplified via polymerase chain reaction (PCR), the subsequently used as the library for the next round of SELEX. Non-SELEX methods also exist including CompELS. CompELS differs from SELEX in that rather than amplifying the highest affinity strand each round, new strands are introduced iteratively to generate competition. After several rounds of selection with new strands added each time, the highest affinity binding aptamer is isolated and amplified.

The SELEX process is time-consuming.Traditional SELEX can take weeks to months.Even with a more efficient method such as capillary electrophoresis SELEX, the process can still take up to a few days.Even then, the success rate of obtaining an aptamer candidate remains relatively low.Thus, several types of SELEX methods have been developed to optimize this selection process.

In negative SELEX, the library is introduced to a non-target material such as an affinity column or beads.Aptamers that bind to the non-target material will be washed, and those that did not bind will move forward with the selection process.Counter SELEX is similar to negative SELEX, but the library is also incubated with analogs of the target molecule. The bound and unbound aptamers are separated via electrophoresis in capillary electrophoresis SELEX, which is an efficient method to reduce the number of selection rounds.Bead-based SELEX is perhaps the most common and versatile SELEX method, as beads are widely available and can be modified to fit the experimental needs.

SELEX selection process

With the flexibility to be chemically engineered, low-cost production, low batch-to-batch variations, aptamers offer advantages over traditional antibodies.However, aptamer modification requires expensive reagents with low success rates, and the high binding affinity and specificity have yet to be reflected in vivo testing. As oligonucleotides, aptamers are prone to degradation by nucleases.The low molecular weight poses a risk for filtration from the bloodstream by the kidneys. Even though the binding even is highly selective, aptamers can still bind to unintended targets due to structure similarities.These problems have impeded the potential applications of aptamers.

Researchers optimize aptamers to achieve a variety of beneficial features. The most important feature is specific and sensitive binding to the chosen target. When aptamers are exposed to bodily fluids, as in serum tests or aptamer therapeutics, it is often important for them to resist digestion by DNA- and RNA-destroying enzymes. Therapeutic aptamers often must be modified to clear slowly from the body. Aptamers that change their shape dramatically when they bind their target are useful as molecular switches to turn a sensor on and off. Some aptamers are engineered to fit into a biosensor or in a test of a biological sample. It can be useful in some cases for the aptamer to accomplish a pre-defined level or speed of binding. As the yield of the synthesis used to produce known aptamers shrinks quickly for longer sequences, researchers often truncate aptamers to the minimal binding sequence to reduce the production cost.

== Etymology ==
The word "aptamer" is a neologism coined by Andrew D. Ellington and Jack Szostak in their first publication on the topic. They did not provide a precise definition, stating "We have termed these individual RNA sequences 'aptamers', from the Latin aptus, to fit."

The word itself, however, derives from the Greek word ἅπτω, to connect or fit (as used by Homer (c. 8th century BC)) and μέρος, a component of something larger.

== History ==
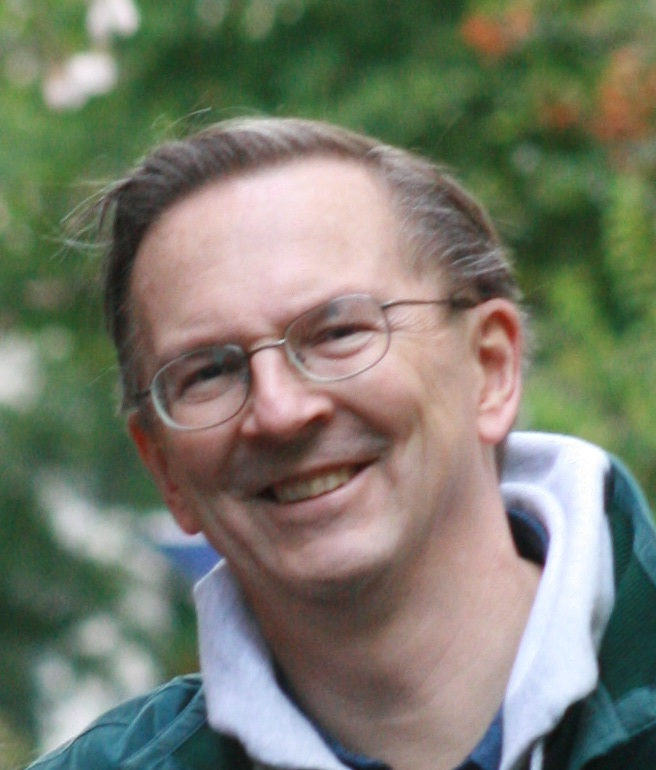
Jack Szostak, Nobel laureate and one of the inventors of SELEX and aptamers.

Since its first application in 1967, directed evolution methodologies have been used to develop biomolecules with new properties and functions. Early examples include the modification of the bacteriophage Qbeta replication system and the generation of ribozymes with modified cleavage activity.

In 1990, two teams independently developed and published SELEX (Systematic Evolution of Ligands by EXponential enrichment) methods and generated RNA aptamers: the lab of Larry Gold, using the term SELEX for their process of selecting RNA ligands against T4 DNA polymerase and the lab of Jack Szostak, selecting RNA ligands against various organic dyes. Two years later, the Szostak lab and Gilead Sciences, acting independently of one another, used in vitro selection schemes to generate DNA aptamers for organic dyes and human thrombin, respectively. In 2001, SELEX was automated by J. Colin Cox in the Ellington lab, reducing the duration of a weeks-long selection experiment to just three days.

In 2002, two groups led by Ronald Breaker and Evgeny Nudler published the first definitive evidence for a riboswitch, a nucleic acid-based genetic regulatory element, the existence of which had previously been suspected. Riboswitches possess similar molecular recognition properties to aptamers. This discovery added support to the RNA World hypothesis, a postulated stage in time in the origin of life on Earth.

== Classification ==
Structural differences between DNA (left), RNA (middle), and XNA (right) backbones

Aptamers are classified as "chemical antibodies" or "antibody mimics". However, most aptamers are small, with a molecular weight of 6-30 kDa, in contrast to the 150 kDa size of antibodies, and contain one binding site rather than the two matching antigen binding regions of a typical antibody.

The major classifications of aptamers are nucleic acid aptamers (DNA, RNA, and XNA) and peptide aptamers. The main difference between the nucleic acid aptamers is the sugar phosphate backbone.RNA has a hydroxyl group at the 2' position of the ribose, making less stable and more prone to nuclease degradation, whereas DNA lacks this hydroxyl group at its 2'.XNA has synthetic sugar phosphate backbones, using different nucleobase, sugar, and phosphate groups.

Naturally found D-sugar backbone of aptamers and its synthetic mirror-image L-sugar backbone of Spiegelmers

A new class of aptamers, Spiegelmers, are synthesized from L-oligonucleotides, as opposed to naturally found D-oligonucleotides.Because L-oligos are not found in nature, Spiegelmers could bypass nuclease degradation and have a longer shelf life.

== Properties ==
Most aptamers are based on a specific oligomer sequence of 20-100 bases and 3-20 kDa. Some have chemical modifications for functional enhancements or compatibility with larger engineered molecular systems. DNA, RNA, XNA, and peptide aptamer chemistries can each offer distinct profiles in terms of shelf stability, durability in serum or in vivo, specificity and sensitivity, cost, ease of generation, amplification, and characterization, and familiarity to users. Typically, DNA- and RNA-based aptamers exhibit low immunogenicity, are amplifiable via Polymerase Chain Reaction (PCR), and have complex secondary structure and tertiary structure. DNA- and XNA-based aptamers exhibit superior shelf stability. XNA-based aptamers can introduce additional chemical diversity to increase binding affinity or greater durability in serum or in vivo.

As 22 genetically encoded and over 500 naturally occurring amino acids exist, peptide aptamers, as well as antibodies, have much greater potential combinatorial diversity per unit length relative to the 4 nucleic acids in DNA or RNA. Chemical modifications of nucleic acid bases or backbones increase the chemical diversity of standard nucleic acid bases.

=== in vivo Properties ===
Variations of complementary segments binding that form secondary structure in ssDNA Aptamers.

Unmodified aptamers are cleared rapidly from the bloodstream, with a half-life of seconds to hours. This is mainly due to nuclease degradation, which physically destroys the aptamers, as well as clearance by the kidneys, a result of the aptamer's low molecular weight and size. Several modifications, such as 2'-fluorine-substituted pyrimidines and polyethylene glycol (PEG) linkage, permit a serum half-life of days to weeks. PEGylation can add sufficient mass and size to prevent clearance by the kidneys in vivo. Unmodified aptamers can treat coagulation disorders. The problem of clearance and nuclease digestion is diminished when they are applied to the eye, where there is a lower concentration of nuclease and the rate of clearance is lower. Rapid clearance from serum can also be useful in some applications, such as in vivo diagnostic imaging.

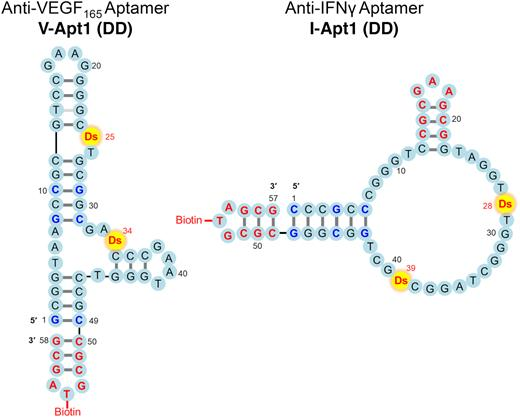
Complementary base pairing is visible in the black lines connecting base pairs. Note the examples of chemical modifications to the base aptamer. Unnatural bases (yellow) enhance its durability. The biotin molecule addition allows the aptamer to be anchored to streptavidin for various sensor and assay applications.

=== Secondary Structure Motifs ===
Like a simplified protein, aptamers also form distinct motifs that play an important role in their binding capacity and stability. These structural motifs include complementary nucleotide binding to form hairpin loops or stems and guanidine-rich regions forming g-quadruplexes. Not all ssDNA aptamers form g-quadruplexes, and they typically require a cation to stabilize the structure when folding. These secondary structures combine to form the overall tertiary structure of the aptamer that enables it to bind tightly to the target molecule. Additionally, complementary base pairing and g-quadruplex formation give aptamers added stability and durability so they can still be useful in diverse environments.

=== 3' and 5' Modifications to Nucleic Acid Aptamers ===
The binding properties of aptamers are supplemented by the variety of 3' and 5' modifications that can be added. These modifications allow for the use of aptamers in a variety of experimental techniques like detection assays or in drug delivery systems.

3' and 5' Modifications
Modifications	Purpose	Applications
Biotin	Allows aptamers to bind tightly to streptavidin	Pull down assays, aptamer target validation
Fluorophores	Allows detection of aptamers via fluorescence microscopy	
Thiol group	Bind to electrodes, oxidation reactions, bind to polymer beads, silicon gel plates	Electrochemical sensors
Inverted dT Cap	Protects against exonuclease degradation in vivo	Drug-delivery systems
TEG Spacer	Extends chemical modifications away from important binding motifs so they are still accessible during xptamer-target interactions	

== Characterization ==
Validation of aptamer structure and function has become increasingly important as the ease of creating new aptamer sequences has surpassed the ability to characterize them. Circular Dichroism (CD) spectroscopy was the dominant method used historically but is now suplemented with both empircal and computational techniques including NUPACK, Mfold, nuclear magnetic resonance spectroscopy (NMR), cryogenic electron microscopy (cryo-EM), and AlphaFold 3(AI-driven modeling).

CD spectroscopy is especially helpful in tracking the formation of G-quadruplexes in nucleic acid aptamers. The topology of aptamer g-quadruplexes can either be parallel, antiparallel, or mixed and can either be formed via one aptamer (unimolecular) or two (bimolecular). The variation of these two aspects determines the unique CD spectra maximum and minimum values for each aptamer. These local maximum and minimum peaks can occur at 210nm, 240nm, 265nm, and 295nm.

While CD spectroscopy helps characterize aptamer secondary structure, its limitations include the following:

- DNA absorbs strongly at 260nm so some g-quadruplex absorption is washed out by the primary structure of the aptamer
- Overall resolution is poor
- Cannot measure in complex solvent environments that are more typical of physiological conditions

Despite these limitations, CD spectroscopy is still widely used to classify the secondary structure of aptamers and particularly useful when working with aptamers that experience conformational changes upon binding their target. NUPACK and Mfold are thermodynamic folding algorithms that provide similar information (existence of secondary structure motifs) and resolution as CD spectroscopy.

In addition to those techniques that measure secondary structure, NMR and Cryo-EM provide atomic-level resolution that enables tertiary structure characterization and native environment measurements.

== Aptamer Applications ==
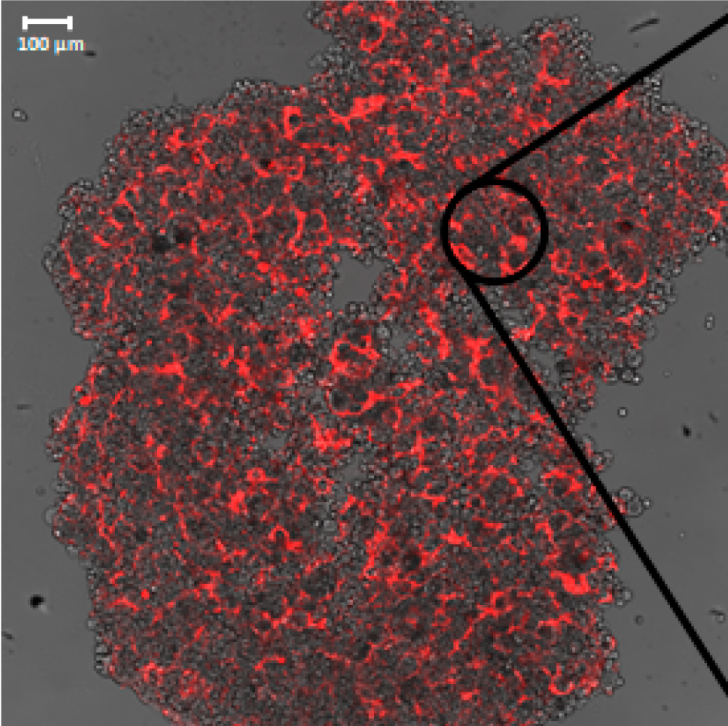
Breast cancer cells incubated with aptamers that bind selectively to biomarkers on the cancer cells, but not to healthy cells. Aptamers are linked to Alexa Fluor 594, a molecule that glows red under UV light. This type of test allows a doctor or researcher to identify cancer cells in a tissue sample from a patient.

Aptamer applications can be roughly grouped into sensing, therapeutic, reagent production, and engineering categories. Sensing applications are important in environmental, biomedical, epidemiological, biosecurity, and basic research applications, where aptamers act as probes in assays, imaging methods, diagnostic assays, and biosensors. In therapeutic applications and precision medicine, aptamers can function as drugs, as targeted drug delivery vehicles, as controlled release mechanisms, and as reagents for drug discovery via high-throughput screening for small molecules and proteins. Aptamers have application for protein production monitoring, quality control, and purification. They can function in molecular engineering applications as a way to modify proteins, such as enhancing DNA polymerase to make PCR more reliable.

=== Targets ===
Aptamer targets can include small molecules and heavy metal ions, larger ligands such as proteins, and even whole cells. These targets include lysozyme, thrombin, human immunodeficiency virus trans-acting responsive element (HIV TAR), hemin, interferon γ, vascular endothelial growth factor (VEGF), prostate specific antigen (PSA), dopamine, and the non-classical oncogene, heat shock factor 1 (HSF1).

Aptamers have been generated against cancer cells, prions, bacteria, and viruses. Viral targets of aptamers include influenza A and B viruses, Respiratory syncytial virus (RSV), SARS coronavirus (SARS-CoV) and SARS-CoV-2.

Aptamers may be particularly useful for environmental science proteomics. Antibodies, like other proteins, are more difficult to sequence than nucleic acids. They are also costly to maintain and produce, and are at constant risk of contamination, as they are produced via cell culture or are harvested from animal serum. For this reason, researchers interested in little-studied proteins and species may find that companies will not produce, maintain, or adequately validate the quality of antibodies against their target of interest. By contrast, aptamers are simple to sequence and cost nothing to maintain, as their exact structure can be stored digitally and synthesized on demand. This may make them more economically feasible as research tools for underfunded biological research subjects. Aptamers exist for plant compounds, such as theophylline (found in tea) and abscisic acid (a plant immune hormone). An aptamer against a-amanitin (the toxin that causes lethal Amanita poisoning) has been developed, an example of an aptamer against a mushroom target.

Because the affinity of the aptamer also affects its dynamic range and limit of detection, aptamers with a lower affinity may be desirable when assaying high concentrations of a target molecule. Affinity chromatography also depends on the ability of the affinity reagent, such as an aptamer, to bind and release its target, and lower affinities may aid in the release of the target molecule. Hence, specific applications determine the useful range for aptamer affinity.

=== Antibody replacement ===
Aptamers can replace antibodies in many biotechnology applications. In laboratory research and clinical diagnostics, they can be used in aptamer-based versions of immunoassays including enzyme-linked immunosorbent assay (ELISA), western blot, immunohistochemistry (IHC), and flow cytometry. As therapeutics, they can function as agonists or antagonists of their ligand. While antibodies are a familiar technology with a well-developed market, aptamers are a relatively new technology to most researchers, and aptamers have been generated against only a fraction of important research targets. Unlike antibodies, unmodified aptamers are more susceptible to nuclease digestion in serum and renal clearance in vivo. Aptamers are much smaller in size and mass than antibodies, which could be a relevant factor in choosing which is best suited for a given application. When aptamers are available for a particular application, their advantages over antibodies include potentially lower immunogenicity, greater replicability and lower cost, a greater level of control due to the in vitro selection conditions, and capacity to be efficiently engineered for durability, specificity, and sensitivity.

In addition, aptamers contribute to reduction of research animal use. While antibodies often rely on animals for initial discovery, as well as for production in the case of polyclonal antibodies, both the selection and production of aptamers is typically animal-free. However, phage display methods allow for selection of antibodies in vitro, followed by production from a monoclonal cell line, avoiding the use of animals entirely.

=== Split Aptamer Biosensors ===
Another innovation of traditional aptamers includes split apatmers. Split aptamers are composed of two or more DNA strands that are pieces of a larger parent aptamer that has been broken in two by a molecular nick. The ability of each component strand to bind targets will depend on the location of the nick, as well as the secondary structures of the daughter strands. The presence of a target molecule supports the joining of DNA fragments. This can be used as the basis for biosensors. Once assembled, the two separate DNA strands can be ligated into a single strand.

=== Controlled release of therapeutics ===
The ability of aptamers to reversibly bind molecules such as proteins has generated increasing interest in using them to facilitate controlled release of therapeutic biomolecules, such as growth factors. This can be accomplished by tuning the binding strength to passively release the growth factors, along with active release via mechanisms such as hybridization of the aptamer with complementary oligonucleotides or unfolding of the aptamer due to cellular traction forces.

=== Tissue Engineering Application ===
Aptamer, known for their ability to bind specific molecules reversibly, have been used in 3D bioprinting tissues to precisely deliver growth factors to promote vascularization. This controlled delivery allows growth factors to be released at the right place and time, encouraging the formation of localized and complex vascular networks.

=== AptaBiD ===
AptaBiD (Aptamer-Facilitated Biomarker Discovery) is an aptamer-based method for biomarker discovery.

=== Future Considerations ===
In a study on aptamers designed to bind with proteins associated with Ebola infection, a comparison was made among three aptamers isolated for their ability to bind the target protein EBOV sGP. Although these aptamers vary in both sequence and structure, they exhibit remarkably similar relative affinities for sGP from EBOV and SUDV, as well as EBOV GP1.2. Notably, these aptamers demonstrated a high degree of specificity for the GP gene products. One aptamer, in particular, proved effective as a recognition element in an electrochemical sensor, enabling the detection of sGP and GP1.2 in solution, as well as GP1.2 within a membrane context. The results of this research point to the intriguing possibility that certain regions on protein surfaces may possess aptatropic qualities. Identifying the key features of such sites, in conjunction with improved 3-D structural predictions for aptamers, holds the potential to enhance the accuracy of predicting aptamer interaction sites on proteins. This, in turn, may help identify aptamers with a heightened likelihood of binding proteins with high affinity, as well as shed light on protein mutations that could significantly impact aptamer binding. This comprehensive understanding of the structure-based interactions between aptamers and proteins is vital for refining the computational predictability of aptamer-protein binding. Moreover, it has the potential to eventually eliminate the need for the experimental SELEX protocol.

== Peptide Aptamers ==
While most aptamers are based on DNA, RNA, or XNA, peptide aptamers are artificial proteins selected or engineered to bind specific target molecules.

=== Structure ===
Peptide aptamers consist of one or more peptide loops of variable sequence displayed by a protein scaffold. Derivatives known as tadpoles, in which peptide aptamer "heads" are covalently linked to unique sequence double-stranded DNA "tails", allow quantification of scarce target molecules in mixtures by PCR (using, for example, the quantitative real-time polymerase chain reaction) of their DNA tails. The peptides that form the aptamer variable regions are synthesized as part of the same polypeptide chain as the scaffold and are constrained at their N and C termini by linkage to it. This double structural constraint decreases the diversity of the 3D structures that the variable regions can adopt, and this reduction in structural diversity lowers the entropic cost of molecular binding when interaction with the target causes the variable regions to adopt a uniform structure.

=== Selection ===
The most common peptide aptamer selection system is the yeast two-hybrid system. Peptide aptamers can also be selected from combinatorial peptide libraries constructed by phage display and other surface display technologies such as mRNA display, ribosome display, bacterial display and yeast display. These experimental procedures are also known as biopanning. All the peptides panned from combinatorial peptide libraries have been stored in the MimoDB database.

=== Applications ===
Libraries of peptide aptamers have been used as "mutagens", in studies in which an investigator introduces a library that expresses different peptide aptamers into a cell population, selects for a desired phenotype, and identifies those aptamers that cause the phenotype. The investigator then uses those aptamers as baits, for example in yeast two-hybrid screens to identify the cellular proteins targeted by those aptamers. Such experiments identify particular proteins bound by the aptamers, and protein interactions that the aptamers disrupt, to cause the phenotype. In addition, peptide aptamers derivatized with appropriate functional moieties can cause specific post-translational modification of their target proteins, or change the subcellular localization of the targets.

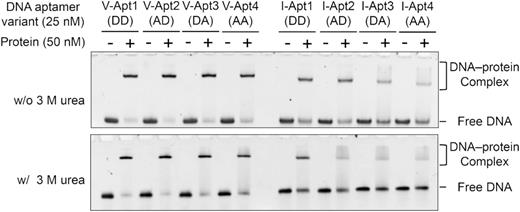
This assay tests the ability of two different types of aptamers (V and I) to detect their respective protein targets (VEGF and IFN-y). The labels Apt1, Apt2, Apt3, and Apt4 are in decreasing order of binding strength (i.e. Apt1 is the strongest aptamer). The DD, AD, DA, and AA letters mean that they have different combinations of unnatural base pairs. This causes their difference in binding strengths. The "-" columns have no protein, and the "+" columns do have protein. Aptamer with protein (+) and without protein (-) is loaded into wells in a gel and moves down the column lanes. If target is present, they bind and travel more slowly, due to the charge on the aptamer and the mass of the protein. Otherwise, the unbound aptamer moves quickly to the end of the lane. The difference in position between the "+" and "-" bands is the "mobility shift." This allows the researcher to detect the presence or absence of the protein. The darker band in the leftmost V and I lanes show that stronger aptamer-target binding makes it easier to detect the target at a given amount of target protein in the sample. The bottom image includes denaturing urea in the gel that disrupts aptamer-target binding in the weaker I aptamers, showing that the aptamer-protein binding is indeed what caused the mobility shift.

== Industry and Research Community ==
Commercial products and companies based on aptamers include the drug Macugen (pegaptanib) and the clinical diagnostic company SomaLogic. The International Society on Aptamers (INSOAP), a professional society for the aptamer research community, publishes a journal devoted to the topic, Aptamers. Apta-index is a current database cataloging and simplifying the ordering process for over 700 aptamers.

Currently, there are two FDA-approved aptamer drugs: Pegaptanib and Avacincaptad pegol. Pegaptanib (Macugen) is an RNA aptamer and was approved in 2004 to treat age-related macular degeneration (AMD). Pegaptanib binds to VEGF-165, a glycoprotein that plays a role in angiogenesis and vascular leakage and inhibits its binding to its receptors. The second aptamer drug, Avacincaptad pegol (Izervay), was approved in 2023 for treatment of geographic atrophy (GA). Avacincaptad pegol inhibits membrane-attack complex formation, which helps reduce cell death and retinal degradation.

== See also ==
- Anti-thrombin aptamers – Oligonucleotides which recognize the exosites of human thrombin
- Deoxyribozyme – DNA oligonucleotides that can perform a specific chemical reaction
- Synthetic antibody – Affinity reagents generated entirely in vitro
- Antibody – Protein(s) forming a major part of an organism's immune system
- Oligonucleotide – Class of short biopolymers
- Xeno nucleic acid – Synthetic nucleic acid analogues
- Primary and secondary antibodies
- Oligonucleotide synthesis – Chemical synthesis of nucleic acids
- Morpholino nucleic acid – Chemical compound
- Nucleic acid analogue – Compound analogous to naturally occurring RNA and DNA
