= Shadow biosphere =

Hypothetical biosphere of Earth

A shadow biosphere is a hypothetical microbial biosphere of Earth that would use radically different biochemical and molecular processes from those of known life. Although life on Earth is fairly well studied, if a shadow biosphere exists, it may be unnoticed because the exploration of micro-organisms targets primarily the biochemistry of macro-organisms.

== Hypothesis ==
It has been proposed that the early Earth hosted multiple origins of life, some of which produced chemical variations on life as we know it. Some argue that these alternative life forms could have become extinct, either by being out-competed by other forms of life, or they might have become one with the present day life via mechanisms like lateral gene transfer. Others, however, argue that this other form of life might still exist to this day.

Steven A. Benner, Alonso Ricardo, and Matthew A. Carrigan, biochemists at the University of Florida, argued that if organisms based on RNA once existed, they might still be alive today, unnoticed because they do not contain ribosomes, which are usually used to detect living microorganisms. They suggest searching for them in environments that are low in sulfur, environments that are spatially constrained (for example, minerals with pores smaller than one micrometre), or environments that cycle between extreme hot and cold.

Other proposed candidates for a shadow biosphere include organisms using different suites of amino acids in their proteins or different molecular units (e.g., bases or sugars) in their nucleic acids, having a chirality opposite of ours, using some of the nonstandard amino acids, or using arsenic instead of phosphorus, having a different genetic code, or even another kind of chemical for its genetic material that are not nucleic acids (DNA nor RNA) chains or biopolymers. Carol Cleland, a philosopher of science at the University of Colorado (Boulder), argues that desert varnish, whose status as biological or nonbiological has been debated since the time of Darwin, should be investigated as a potential candidate for a shadow biosphere.

Existence of a shadow biosphere could mean that life has independently evolved on Earth more than once, which means that microorganisms may exist on Earth which have no evolutionary connection with any other known form of life. It is suggested that if an alternate form of microbial life on Earth is discovered, the odds are good that life is also common elsewhere in the universe.

== Criticism ==
Methods used by proponents and conclusions drawn from experiments that purport to show evidence of shadow biospheres have been criticized. For example, evidence that once seemed to support arsenic as a substitute for phosphorus in DNA could have resulted from lab or field contamination, and DNA that includes arsenic is chemically unstable.

== See also ==
- Abiogenesis – Life arising from non-living matter
- Astrobiology – Science concerned with life in the universe
- Biological dark matter – Unclassified/poorly understood genetics
- DNA – Molecule that carries genetic information
- Extremophile – Organisms capable of living in extreme environments
- GFAJ-1 – Strain of bacteria
- Hypothetical types of biochemistry – Possible alternative biochemicals used by life forms
- Panspermia – Hypothesis on the interstellar spreading of primordial life
- Purple Earth hypothesis – Astrobiological hypothesis regarding early photosynthetic organisms
- RNA world hypothesis – Hypothetical stage in the early evolutionary history of life on Earth
- Xenobiology – Science of synthetic life forms
- Mirror life – Hypothetical life with reversed molecular chirality
