= Xenobiology =

Science of synthetic life forms

Xenobiology (XB) is a subfield of synthetic biology, the study of synthesizing and manipulating biological devices and systems. The name xenobiology derives from the Ancient Greek word ξένος (xénos), meaning "stranger", "foreigner", or "alien". Xenobiology is a form of biology that is not (yet) familiar to science and is not found in nature. In practice, it describes novel biological systems and biochemistries that differ from the canonical DNA–RNA-20 amino acid system (see central dogma of molecular biology). For example, instead of DNA or RNA, the field of xenobiology explores nucleic acid analogues, termed xeno nucleic acid (XNA) as information carriers. It also focuses on an expanded genetic code and the incorporation of non-proteinogenic amino acids, or "xeno amino acids" into proteins.

== Difference between xeno-, exo-, and astro-biology ==
"Astro" means "star" and "exo" means "outside". Both exo- and astrobiology deal with the search for naturally evolved life in the Universe, mostly on other planets in the circumstellar habitable zone. (These are also occasionally referred to as xenobiology.) Whereas astrobiologists are concerned with the detection and analysis of life elsewhere in the Universe, xenobiology attempts to design forms of life with a different biochemistry or different genetic code than on planet Earth.

== Aims ==
- Xenobiology has the potential to reveal fundamental knowledge about biology and the origin of life. In order to better understand the origin of life, it is necessary to know why life evolved seemingly via an early RNA world to the DNA-RNA-protein system and its nearly universal genetic code. Was it an evolutionary "accident" or were there constraints that ruled out other types of chemistries? By testing alternative biochemical "primordial soups", it is expected to better understand the principles that gave rise to life as we know it.
- Xenobiology is an approach to develop industrial production systems with novel capabilities by means of biopolymer engineering and pathogen resistance. The genetic code encodes in all organisms 20 canonical amino acids that are used for protein biosynthesis. In rare cases, special amino acids such as selenocysteine or pyrrolysine can be incorporated by the translational apparatus into the proteins of some organisms. Together, these 20+2 Amino Acids are known as the 22 Proteinogenic Amino Acids. By using additional amino acids from among the over 700 known to biochemistry, the capabilities of proteins may be altered to give rise to more efficient catalytical or material functions. The EC-funded project Metacode, for example, aims to incorporate metathesis (a useful catalytical function so far not known in living organisms) into bacterial cells. Xenobiology could also potentially improve production processes by reducing the risk of viral or bacteriophage contamination in cultivations. In theory, xenobiological cells would not be susceptible to contamination by existing viruses and phages. This approach is referred to as semantic containment.
- Xenobiology offers the option to design a "genetic firewall", a novel biocontainment system, which may help to strengthen and diversify current bio-containment approaches. One concern with traditional genetic engineering and biotechnology is horizontal gene transfer to the environment and possible risks to human health. One concept commonly explored within xenobiology is the design of alternative genetic codes and biochemistries so that horizontal gene transfer is no longer possible. Additionally alternative biochemistry also allows for new synthetic auxotrophies. The idea is to create an orthogonal biological system that would be incompatible with natural genetic systems.

== Scientific approach ==
In xenobiology, the aim is to design and construct biological systems that differ from their natural counterparts on one or more fundamental levels. Ideally these new-to-nature organisms would be different in every possible biochemical aspect exhibiting a very different genetic code. The long-term goal is to construct a cell that would store its genetic information not in DNA but in an alternative informational polymer consisting of xeno nucleic acids (XNA), different base pairs, using non-canonical amino acids and an altered genetic code. So far cells have been constructed that incorporate only one or two of these features.

=== Xeno nucleic acids (XNA) ===
Originally this research on alternative forms of DNA was driven by the question of how life evolved on earth and why RNA and DNA were selected by (chemical) evolution over other possible nucleic acid structures. Two hypotheses for the selection of RNA and DNA as life's backbone are either they are favored under life on Earth's conditions, or they were coincidentally present in pre-life chemistry and continue to be used now. Systematic experimental studies aiming at the diversification of the chemical structure of nucleic acids have resulted in completely novel informational biopolymers. So far a number of XNAs with new chemical backbones or leaving group of the DNA have been synthesized, e.g.: hexose nucleic acid (HNA); threose nucleic acid (TNA), glycol nucleic acid (GNA) cyclohexenyl nucleic acid (CeNA). The incorporation of XNA in a plasmid, involving 3 HNA codons, has been accomplished already in 2003. This XNA is used in vivo (E coli) as template for DNA synthesis. This study, using a binary (G/T) genetic cassette and two non-DNA bases (Hx/U), was extended to CeNA, while GNA seems to be too alien at this moment for the natural biological system to be used as template for DNA synthesis. Extended bases using a natural DNA backbone could, likewise, be transliterated into natural DNA, although to a more limited extent.

Aside being used as extensions to template DNA strands, XNA activity has been tested for use as genetic catalysts. Although proteins are the most common components of cellular enzymatic activity, nucleic acids are also used in the cell to catalyze reactions. A 2015 study found several different kinds of XNA, most notably FANA (2'-fluoroarabino nucleic acids), as well as HNA, CeNA and ANA (arabino nucleic acids) could be used to cleave RNA during post-transcriptional RNA processing acting as XNA enzymes, hence the name XNAzymes. FANA XNAzymes also showed the ability to ligate DNA, RNA and XNA substrates. Although XNAzyme studies are still preliminary, this study was a step in the direction of searching for synthetic circuit components that are more efficient than those containing DNA and RNA counterparts that can regulate DNA, RNA, and their own, XNA, substrates.

=== Expanding the genetic alphabet ===
While XNAs have modified backbones, other experiments target the replacement or enlargement of the genetic alphabet of DNA with unnatural base pairs. For example, DNA has been designed that has – instead of the four standard bases A, T, G, and C – six bases A, T, G, C, and the two new ones P and Z (where Z stands for 6-Amino-5-nitro3-(l'-p-D-2'-deoxyribofuranosyl)-2(1H)-pyridone, and P stands for 2-Amino-8-(1-beta-D-2'-deoxyribofuranosyl)imidazo[1,2-a]-1,3,5-triazin-4 (8H)). In a systematic study, Leconte et al. tested the viability of 60 candidate bases (yielding potentially 3600 base pairs) for possible incorporation in the DNA.

In 2002, Hirao et al. developed an unnatural base pair between 2-amino-8-(2-thienyl)purine (s) and pyridine-2-one (y) that functions in vitro in transcription and translation toward a genetic code for protein synthesis containing a non-standard amino acid. In 2006, they created 7-(2-thienyl)imidazo[4,5-b]pyridine (Ds) and pyrrole-2-carbaldehyde (Pa) as a third base pair for replication and transcription, and afterward, Ds and 4-[3-(6-aminohexanamido)-1-propynyl]-2-nitropyrrole (Px) was discovered as a high fidelity pair in PCR amplification. In 2013, they applied the Ds-Px pair to DNA aptamer generation by in vitro selection (SELEX) and demonstrated the genetic alphabet expansion significantly augment DNA aptamer affinities to target proteins.

In May 2014, researchers announced that they had successfully introduced two new artificial nucleotides into bacterial DNA, alongside the four naturally occurring nucleotides, and by including individual artificial nucleotides in the culture media, were able to passage the bacteria 24 times; they did not create mRNA or proteins able to use the artificial nucleotides.

=== Novel polymerases ===
Neither the XNA nor the unnatural bases are recognized by natural polymerases. One of the major challenges is to find or create novel types of polymerases that will be able to replicate these new-to-nature constructs. In one case a modified variant of the HIV-reverse transcriptase was found to be able to PCR-amplify an oligonucleotide containing a third type base pair. Pinheiro et al. (2012) demonstrated that the method of polymerase evolution and design successfully led to the storage and recovery of genetic information (of less than 100bp length) from six alternative genetic polymers based on simple nucleic acid architectures not found in nature, xeno nucleic acids.

=== Genetic code engineering ===
One of the goals of xenobiology is to rewrite the genetic code. The most promising approach to change the code is the reassignment of seldom used or even unused codons. In an ideal scenario, the genetic code is expanded by one codon, thus having been liberated from its old function and fully reassigned to a non-canonical amino acid (ncAA) ("code expansion"). As these methods are laborious to implement, and some short cuts can be applied ("code engineering"), for example in bacteria that are auxotrophic for specific amino acids and at some point in the experiment are fed isostructural analogues instead of the canonical amino acids for which they are auxotrophic. In that situation, the canonical amino acid residues in native proteins are substituted with the ncAAs. Even the insertion of multiple different ncAAs into the same protein is possible. Finally, the repertoire of 20 canonical amino acids can not only be expanded, but also reduced to 19. By reassigning transfer RNA (tRNA)/aminoacyl-tRNA synthetase pairs the codon specificity can be changed. Cells endowed with such aminoacyl-[tRNA synthetases] are thus able to read [mRNA] sequences that make no sense to the existing gene expression machinery. Altering the codon: tRNA synthetases pairs may lead to the in vivo incorporation of the non-canonical amino acids into proteins. In the past reassigning codons was mainly done on a limited scale. In 2013, however, Farren Isaacs and George Church at Harvard University reported the replacement of all 321 TAG stop codons present in the genome of E. coli with synonymous TAA codons, thereby demonstrating that massive substitutions can be combined into higher-order strains without lethal effects. Following the success of this genome wide codon replacement, the authors continued and achieved the reprogramming of 13 codons throughout the genome, directly affecting 42 essential genes.

An even more radical change in the genetic code is the change of a triplet codon to a quadruplet and even quintuplet codon pioneered by Sisido in cell-free systems and by Schultz in bacteria. Finally, non-natural base pairs can be used to introduce novel amino acid in proteins.

=== Directed evolution ===
The goal of substituting DNA by XNA may also be reached by another route, namely by engineering the environment instead of the genetic modules. This approach has been successfully demonstrated by Marlière and Mutzel with the production of an E. coli strain whose DNA is composed of standard A, C and G nucleotides but has the synthetic thymine analogue 5-chlorouracil instead of thymine (T) in the corresponding positions of the sequence. These cells are then dependent on externally supplied 5-chlorouracil for growth, but otherwise they look and behave as normal E. coli. These cells, however, are currently not yet fully auxotrophic for the Xeno-base since they are still growing on thymine when this is supplied to the medium.

== Biosafety ==
Xenobiological systems are designed to convey orthogonality to natural biological systems. A (still hypothetical) organism that uses XNA, different base pairs and polymerases and has an altered genetic code will hardly be able to interact with natural forms of life on the genetic level. Thus, these xenobiological organisms represent a genetic enclave that cannot exchange information with natural cells. Altering the genetic machinery of the cell leads to semantic containment. In analogy to information processing in IT, this safety concept is termed a "genetic firewall". The concept of the genetic firewall seems to overcome a number of limitations of previous safety systems. A first experimental evidence of the theoretical concept of the genetic firewall was achieved in 2013 with the construction of a genomically recoded organism (GRO). In this GRO all known UAG stop codons in E.coli were replaced by UAA codons, which allowed for the deletion of release factor 1 and reassignment of UAG translation function. The GRO exhibited increased resistance to T7 bacteriophage, thus showing that alternative genetic codes do reduce genetic compatibility. This GRO, however, is still very similar to its natural "parent" and cannot be regarded to have a genetic firewall. The possibility of reassigning the function of large number of triplets opens the perspective to have strains that combine XNA, novel base pairs, new genetic codes, etc. that cannot exchange any information with the natural biological world. Regardless of changes leading to a semantic containment mechanism in new organisms, any novel biochemical systems still has to undergo a toxicological screening. XNA, novel proteins, etc. might represent novel toxins, or have an allergic potential that needs to be assessed.

== Governance and regulatory issues ==
Xenobiology might challenge the regulatory framework, as currently laws and directives deal with genetically modified organisms and do not directly mention chemically or genomically modified organisms. Taking into account that real xenobiology organisms are not expected in the next few years, policy makers do have some time at hand to prepare themselves for an upcoming governance challenge. Since 2012, the following groups have picked up the topic as a developing governance issue: policy advisers in the US, four National Biosafety Boards in Europe, the European Molecular Biology Organisation, and the European Commission's Scientific Committee on Emerging and Newly Identified Health Risks (SCENIHR) in three opinions (Definition, risk assessment methodologies and safety aspects, and risks to the environment and biodiversity related to synthetic biology and research priorities in the field of synthetic biology.).

== See also ==
- Auxotrophy
- Biological dark matter
- Body plan
- Directed evolution
- Expanded genetic code
- Foldamer
- Hachimoji DNA
- Hypothetical types of biochemistry
- Life definitions
- Nucleic acid analogue
- Purple Earth hypothesis
- RNA world
- Shadow biosphere
