= Carol Cleland =

American philosopher of science

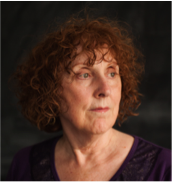
- Born: December 21, 1948 (age 77)

Academic background
- Education: University of California Santa Barbara, BA (Mathematics) Brown University, PhD (Philosophy) Stanford University, Post-Doc (Philosophy & Computer Science)
- Doctoral advisor: Ernest Sosa

Academic work
- Discipline: Philosophy
- Sub-discipline: Philosophy of Science, Metaphysics, Logic, Mathematics
- Institutions: University of Colorado Boulder

Carol Edith Cleland (born December 21, 1948) is an American philosopher of science known for her work on the definition of life and the shadow biosphere, on the classification of minerals by their geological history, on the distinction between historical and experimental approaches to science, and on the Church–Turing thesis on theoretical limits to physical computation. She is a professor of philosophy at the University of Colorado Boulder, holds affiliations with the NASA Astrobiology Institute, the SETI Institute, and the CU Boulder Center for Astrobiology, and directs the Center for Study of Origins.

== Education and career ==
Cleland was an undergraduate at the University of California, Santa Barbara. After starting as a physics major but finding herself ill-suited to experimental work, and trying geology but finding it too male-dominated, she discovered her love for philosophy in her junior year but ended up majoring in mathematics because her science studies had left her much closer to completing the degree requirements for mathematics. She graduated in 1973.

After graduating, she worked as a software engineer before following her husband to Massachusetts and beginning graduate study in philosophy at Brown University. While working towards her doctorate, she took a non-tenure-track assistant professorship at Wheaton College (Massachusetts), where she worked from 1979 to 1984. She completed her Ph.D. at Brown in 1981; her dissertation, Causation: An Irreducible Physical Relation, was supervised by Ernest Sosa.

On the completion of her position at Wheaton College, she spent another year as a software engineer before returning to academia as a postdoctoral researcher at the Center for The Study of Language and Information at Stanford University and then, in 1986, joining the University of Colorado Boulder as an assistant professor again. She was promoted to associate professor in 1993 and full professor in 2006.

== Books ==
Cleland is the author of The Quest for a Universal Theory of Life: Searching for Life As We Don't Know It (Cambridge University Press, 2019). She is the co-editor, with Mark A. Bedau, of The Nature of Life: Classical and Contemporary Perspectives from Philosophy and Science (Cambridge University Press, 2010).
