= Peptide nucleic acid =

Biological molecule

Structure of peptide nucleic acid

Peptide nucleic acid (PNA) is an artificially synthesized polymer similar to DNA or RNA.

Synthetic peptide nucleic acid oligomers have been used in recent years in molecular biology procedures, diagnostic assays, and antisense therapies. Due to their higher binding strength, it is not necessary to design long PNA oligomers for use in these roles, which usually require oligonucleotide probes of 20–25 bases. The main concern of the length of the PNA-oligomers is to guarantee the specificity. PNA oligomers also show greater specificity in binding to complementary DNAs, with a PNA/DNA base mismatch being more destabilizing than a similar mismatch in a DNA/DNA duplex. This binding strength and specificity also applies to PNA/RNA duplexes. PNAs are not easily recognized by either nucleases or proteases, making them resistant to degradation by enzymes. PNAs are also stable over a wide pH range. Though an unmodified PNA cannot readily cross the cell membrane to enter the cytosol, covalent coupling of a cell penetrating peptide to a PNA can improve cytosolic delivery.

PNA is not known to occur naturally but N-(2-aminoethyl)-glycine (AEG), the backbone of PNA, has been hypothesized to be an early form of genetic molecule for life on Earth and is produced by cyanobacteria and is a neurotoxin.

PNA was invented by Peter E. Nielsen (Univ. Copenhagen), Michael Egholm (Univ. Copenhagen), Rolf H. Berg (Risø National Lab), and Ole Buchardt (Univ. Copenhagen) in 1991.

== Structure ==
DNA and RNA have a deoxyribose and ribose sugar backbone, respectively, whereas PNA's backbone is composed of repeating N-(2-aminoethyl)-glycine units linked by peptide bonds. The various purine and pyrimidine bases are linked to the backbone by a methylene bridge (−CH_{2}−) and a carbonyl group (C=O). PNAs are depicted like peptides, with the N-terminus at the first (left) position and the C-terminus at the last (right) position.

== Binding ==
Since the backbone of PNA contains no charged phosphate groups, the binding between PNA/DNA strands is stronger than between DNA/DNA strands due to the lack of electrostatic repulsion. Unfortunately, this also causes it to be rather hydrophobic, which makes it difficult to deliver to body cells in solution without being flushed out of the body first. Early experiments with homopyrimidine strands (strands consisting of only one repeated pyrimidine base) have shown that the T_{m} ("melting" temperature) of a 6-base thymine PNA/adenine DNA double helix was 31 °C in comparison to an equivalent 6-base DNA/DNA duplex that denatures at a temperature less than 10 °C. Mixed base PNA molecules are true mimics of DNA molecules in terms of base-pair recognition. PNA/PNA binding is stronger than PNA/DNA binding.

== PNA translation from other nucleic acids ==
Several labs have reported sequence-specific polymerization of peptide nucleic acids from DNA or RNA templates. Liu and coworkers used these polymerization methods to evolve functional PNAs with the ability to fold into three-dimensional structures, similar to proteins, aptamers and ribozymes.

== Delivery ==
In 2015, Jain et al. described a trans-acting DNA-based amphiphatic delivery system for convenient delivery of poly A tailed uncharged nucleic acids (UNA) such as PNAs and morpholinos, so that several UNA's can be easily screened ex vivo.

== PNA world hypothesis ==
It has been hypothesized that the earliest life on Earth may have used PNA as a genetic material due to its extreme robustness, simpler formation, and possible spontaneous polymerization at 100 °C (while water at standard pressure boils at this temperature, water at high pressure—as in deep ocean—boils at higher temperatures). If this is so, life evolved to a DNA/RNA-based system only at a later stage. Evidence for this PNA world hypothesis is, however, far from conclusive. If it existed though, it must have preceded the widely accepted RNA world.

== Applications ==
Applications include alteration of gene expression - both as inhibitor and promoter in different cases, antigene and antisense therapeutic agent, anticancer agent, antiviral, antibacterial and antiparasitic agent, molecular tools and probes of biosensor, detection of DNA sequences, and nanotechnology.

PNAs can be used to improve high-throughput 16S ribosomal RNA gene sequencing of plant and soil samples by blocking amplification of contaminant plastid and mitochondrial sequences.

Cellular – Functional Antagonism/Inhibition. In 2001, Strauss and colleagues reported the design of an application for PNA oligomers in living mammalian cells. The Xist chromatin binding region was first elucidated in female mouse fibroblastic cells, and embryonic stem cells though the use of a PNA molecular antagonist. The novel PNA approach directly demonstrated function of a lncRNA. The long non-coding (lncRNA) RNA, Xist directly binds to the inactive X-chromosome. Functional PNA inhibition experiments revealed that specific repeat regions of the Xist RNA were responsible for chromatin binding, and hence could be considered domain regions of the RNA transcript. The PNA molecular antagonist was administered to living cells and functionally inhibited the association of Xist with inactive X-chromosome using the approach for studying noncoding RNA function in living cells called peptide nucleic acid (PNA) interference mapping. In the reported experiments, a single 19-bp antisense cell-permeating PNA targeted against a particular region of Xist RNA caused the disruption of the Xi. The association of the Xi with macro-histone H2A is also disturbed by PNA interference mapping.

== See also ==
- Clicked peptide polymer
- Glycol nucleic acid
- Oligonucleotide synthesis
- Peptide synthesis
- Threose nucleic acid
