= Glycol nucleic acid =

Polymer similar to DNA

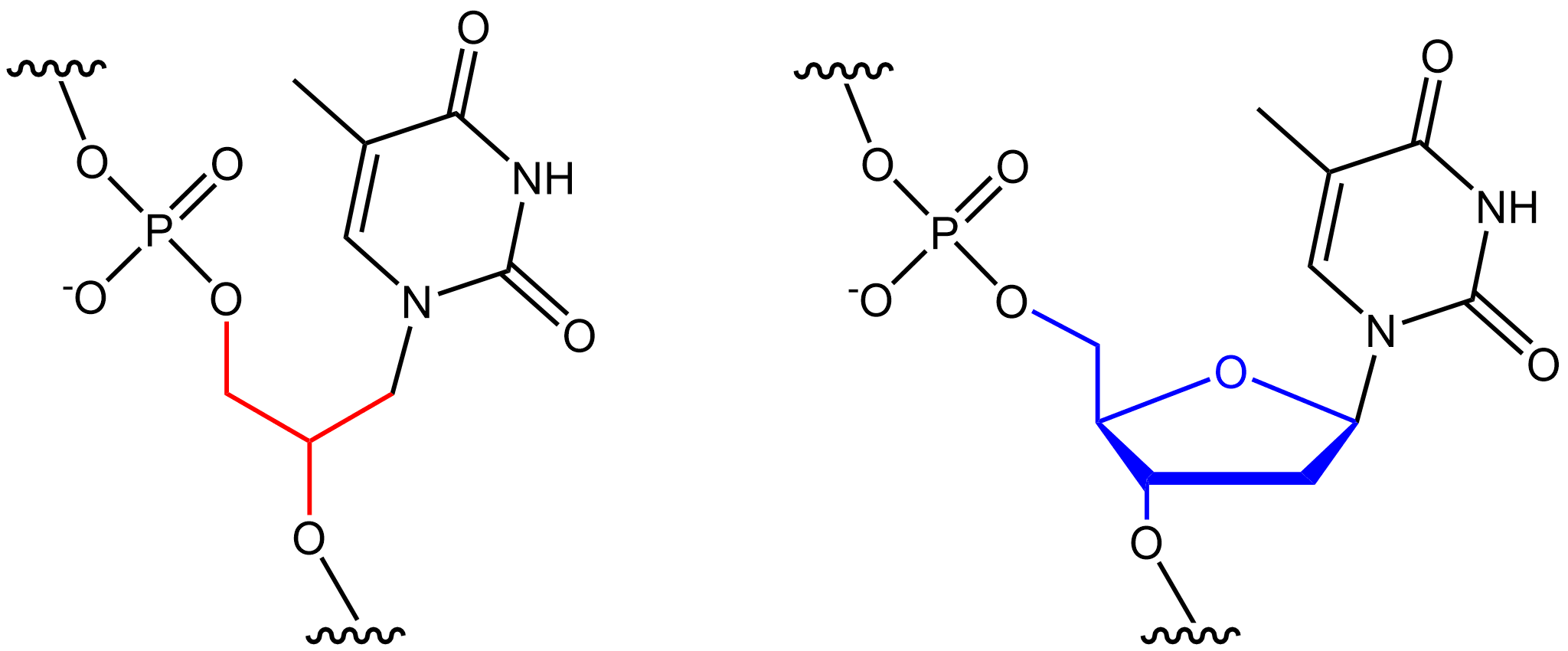
Comparison of skeletons of T residue of GNA (red) and natural T nucleotide in DNA (blue)

Glycol nucleic acid (GNA), sometimes also referred to as glycerol nucleic acid, is a nucleic acid similar to DNA or RNA but differing in the composition of its sugar-phosphodiester backbone, using propylene glycol in place of ribose or deoxyribose. GNA is chemically stable but not known to occur naturally. However, due to its simplicity, it might have played a role in the evolution of life.

The 2,3-dihydroxypropyl nucleoside analogues were first prepared by Ueda et al. (1971). Soon thereafter it was shown that phosphate-linked oligomers of the analogues do in fact exhibit hypochromicity in the presence of RNA and DNA in solution (Seita et al. 1972). The preparation of the polymers was later described by Cook et al. (1995, 1999) and Acevedo and Andrews (1996). However the ability of GNA-GNA self-pairing was first reported by Zhang and Meggers in 2005. Crystal structures of a GNA duplexes were subsequently reported by Essen and Meggers.

DNA and RNA have a deoxyribose and ribose sugar backbone, respectively, whereas GNA's backbone is composed of repeating glycol units linked by phosphodiester bonds. The glycol unit has just three carbon atoms and still shows Watson–Crick base pairing. The Watson–Crick base pairing is much more stable in GNA than its natural counterparts DNA and RNA as it requires a high temperature to melt a duplex of GNA. It is possibly the simplest of the nucleic acids, making it a hypothetical precursor to RNA.

== See also ==
- Abiogenesis
- Locked nucleic acid
- Oligonucleotide synthesis
- Peptide nucleic acid
- Threose nucleic acid
