= Ff phages =

Group of viruses

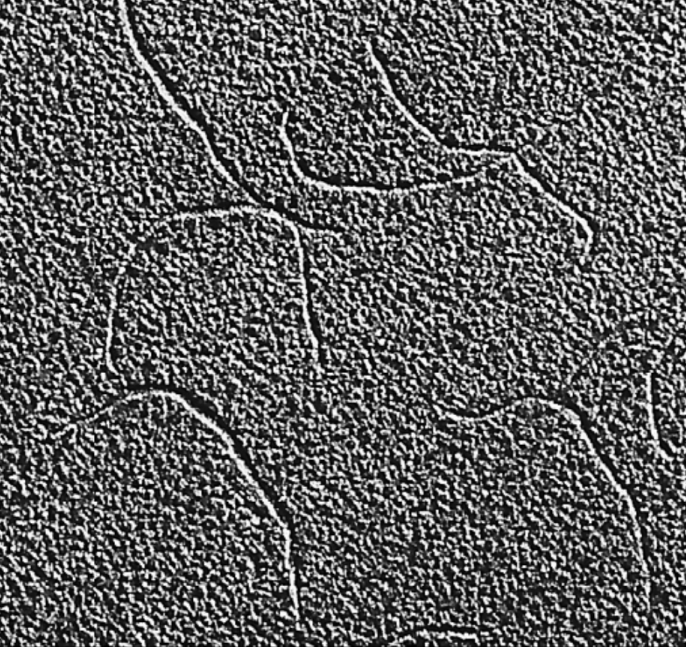
Shadowed electron micrograph of unaligned phage

Ff phages (for F specific filamentous phages) is a group of almost identical filamentous phage (genus Inovirus) including phages f1, fd, M13 and ZJ/2, which infect bacteria bearing the F fertility factor. The virion (virus particle) is a flexible filament measuring about 6 by 900 nm, comprising a cylindrical protein tube protecting a single-stranded circular DNA molecule at its core. The phage codes for only 11 gene products, and is one of the simplest viruses known. It has been widely used to study fundamental aspects of molecular biology. George Smith and Greg Winter used f1 and fd for their work on phage display for which they were awarded a share of the 2018 Nobel Prize in Chemistry. Early experiments on Ff phages used M13 to identify gene functions, and M13 was also developed as a cloning vehicle, so the name M13 is sometimes used as an informal synonym for the whole group of Ff phages.

== Structure ==
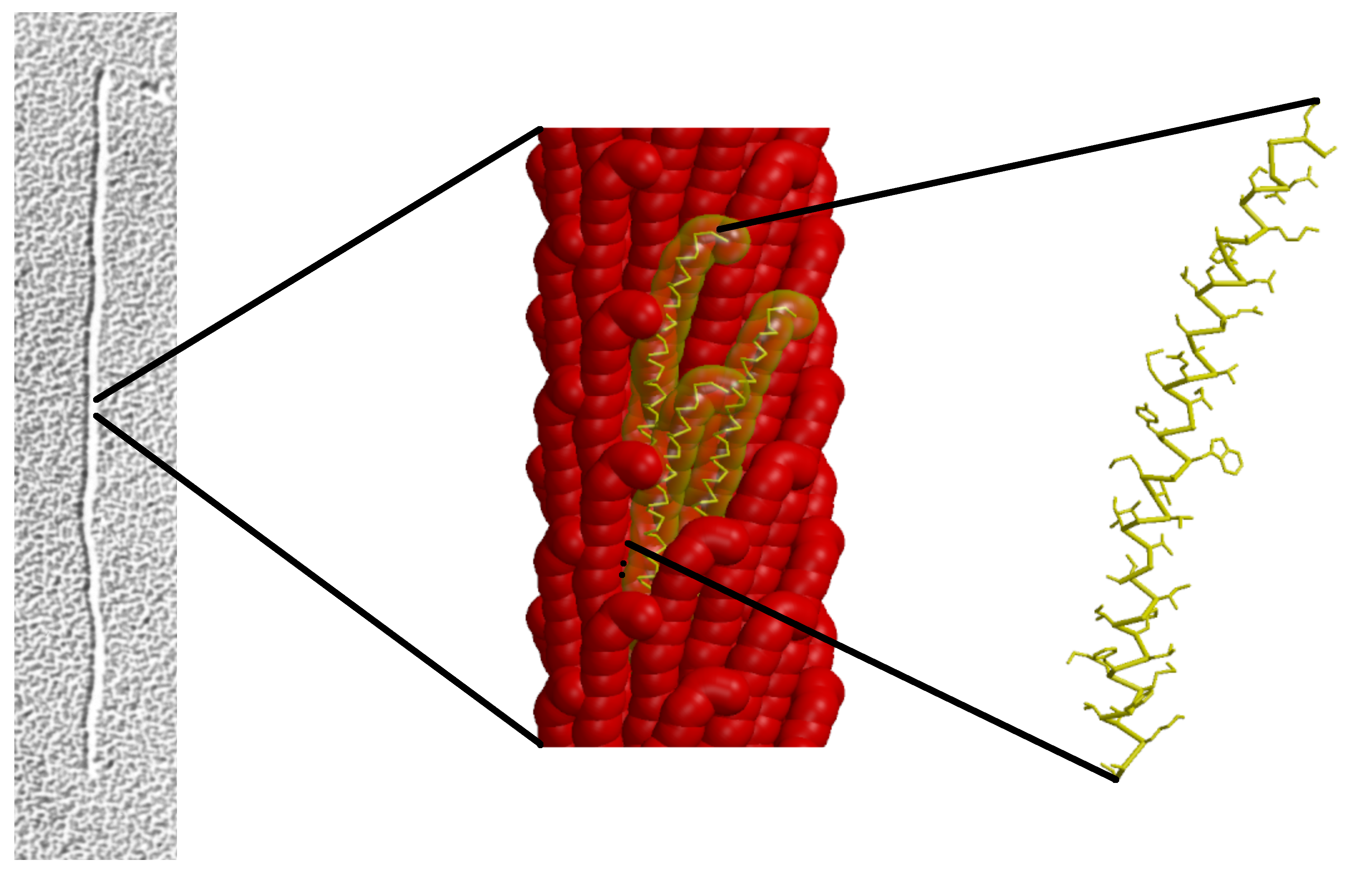
Assembled major coat protein, exploded view

The virion is a flexible filament (worm-like chain) about 6 nm in diameter and 900 nm long. Several thousand copies of a small (50 amino-acid residues) elongated alpha-helical major coat protein subunit (the product of gene 8, or p8) in an overlapping shingle-like array form a hollow cylinder enclosing the circular single-stranded DNA genome. Each p8 subunit has a collection of basic residues near the C-terminus of the elongated protein and acidic residues near the N-terminus; these two regions are separated by about 20 hydrophobic (non-polar) residues. The shingle-like arrangement places the acidic residues of p8 near the outside surface of the cylinder, where they cause the virus particle to be negatively-charged; non-polar regions near non-polar regions of neighbouring p8 subunits, where non-polar interactions contribute to a notable physical stability of the virus particle; and basic residues near the centre of the cylinder, where they interact with the negatively-charged DNA phosphates at the core of the virion. Longer (or shorter) DNA molecules can be packaged, since more (or fewer) p8 subunits can be added during assembly as required to protect the DNA, making the phage useful for genetic studies. (This effect should not be confused with polyphage, which can package several separate and distinct DNA molecules). About 5 copies each of four minor proteins cap the two ends of the virion.

The molecular structure of the virion capsid (the assembly of p8 subunit proteins) has been determined by X-ray fiber diffraction, and structural models have been deposited in the Protein Data Bank. In particular, the series of fd and Pf1 virion structures deposited in the PDB over decades illustrate the improvements in methods for fiber diffraction data collection and computational analysis. Structures of the p3 capsid protein and the p5 replication/assembly protein have also been determined from X-ray crystallography and deposited in the PDB.

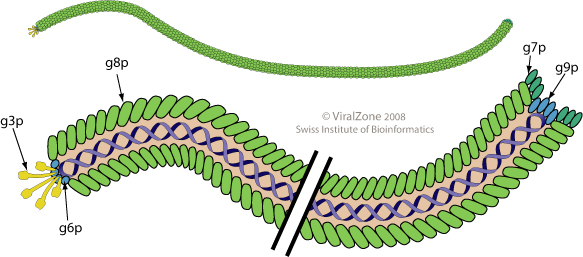
Schematic views showing minor proteins at the two ends

== Genetics ==
The DNA sequence of the fd genome has 6408 nucleotide comprising 9 genes, but the genome has 11 open reading frames producing 11 proteins, since two genes, gene 2 and gene 1, have internal in-frame translation starts, generating two additional proteins, p10 and p11. The genome also contains a short non-coding intergenic sequence. M13 and f1 sequences are slightly different from fd. They both have only 6407 nucleotides; f1 differs from fd in 180 positions (only 10 of these changes are reflected in amino-acid changes in gene products) and M13 has only 59 nucleotide differences from f1. For many purposes the phages in the Ff group can be considered as interchangeable.

Five gene products are part of the virion: the major coat protein (p8) and the minor proteins capping the two ends, p3 and p6 at one end, and p7 and p9 at the other end. Three gene products (p2, p5, and p10) are cytoplasmic proteins needed for DNA synthesis and the rest are membrane proteins involved in assembly of the virion.

Inovirus

Virus classification
- (unranked): Virus
- Realm: Efunaviria
- Kingdom: Loebvirae
- Phylum: Hofneiviricota
- Class: Faserviricetes
- Order: Tubulavirales
- Family: Inoviridae
- Genus: Inovirus

The gene encoding p1 has been used as a conserved marker gene, along with three other features specific for inovirus genomes, in an automatic machine-learning approach to identify over 10000 inovirus-like sequences from microbial genomes.

== Replication cycle ==
=== Infection ===
The p3 protein is anchored to one end of the virion by the C-terminal domain of p3. Infection of host bacteria involves interaction of two different N-terminal regions of p3 with two different sites of the host bacteria. First, the N2 domain of p3 attaches to the outer tip of the F-pilus, and the pilus retracts into the cell. This retraction may involve depolymerization of the pilus subunit assembly into the cell membrane at the base of the pilus by a reversal of the pilus growth and polymerization process. As the tip of the pilus bearing p3 approaches the cell wall, the N1 domain of p3 interacts with the bacterial TolQRA protein to complete infection and release the genome into the cytoplasm of the host.

=== Replication ===
After the single-stranded viral DNA enters the cytoplasm, it serves as a template for the synthesis of a complementary DNA strand. This synthesis is initiated in the intergenic region of the DNA sequence by host RNA polymerase, which synthesizes a short RNA primer on the infecting DNA as template. The host DNA polymerase III then uses this primer to synthesize the full complementary strand of DNA, yielding a double-stranded circle, sometimes called the replicative form (RF) DNA. The complementary strand of the RF is the transcription template for phage coded proteins, especially p2 and p10, which are necessary for further DNA replication.

The p2 protein cleaves the viral strand of the RF DNA, and host DNA polymerase III synthesizes a new viral strand. The old viral strand is displaced as the new one is synthesized. When a circle is complete, the covalently linked p2 cuts the displaced viral strand at the junction between the old and newly synthesized DNA and re-ligates the two ends and liberates p2. RF replicates by this rolling circle mechanism to generate dozens of copies of the RF.

When the concentration of phage proteins has increased, new viral strands are coated by the replication/assembly protein p5 rather than by the complementary DNA strands. The p5 also inhibits translation of p2, so that progeny viral ssDNA production and packaging are in synchrony.

=== Assembly and extrusion ===
Infection does not kill the host bacteria, in contrast to most other families of phage. Progeny phage are assembled as they extrude through the membrane of growing bacteria, probably at adhesion sites joining inner and outer membranes. The five phage proteins that form the coat of the completed phage enter the inner membrane; for p8 and p3, N-terminal leader sequences (later removed) help the proteins to enter the bacterial membrane, with their N-termini directed away from the cytoplasm towards the periplasm. Three other phage membrane proteins that are not present in the phage, p1, p11, and p4, are also involved in assembly. Replication of RF DNA is converted to production of phage ssDNA by coating of the DNA with p5 to form an elongated p5/DNA replication/assembly complex, which then interacts with the membrane-bound phage proteins. The extrusion process picks up the p7 and p9 proteins which form the outer tip of the progeny phage. As the p5 is stripped off the DNA, the progeny DNA is extruded across the membrane and wrapped in a helical casing of p8, to which p3 and p6 are added at the end of assembly. The p4 protein may form an extrusion pore in the outer membrane.

Interaction of the double-stranded packaging DNA signal with the p1-thioredoxin complex at the host inner membrane triggers the formation of a pore. The p1 protein contains Walker motifs which are essential for phage assembly, suggesting that p1 is a molecular motor involved in phage assembly. The p1 protein has a membrane-spanning hydrophobic domain with the N-terminal portion in the cytoplasm and the C-terminal portion in the periplasm (the reverse of the orientation of p8). Adjacent to the cytoplasmic side of the membrane-spanning domain is a 13- residue sequence of p1 having a pattern of basic residues closely matching the pattern of basic residues near the C terminus of p8, but inverted with respect to that sequence.

Intermediate assemblies of p8 can be generated by treating the phage with chloroform. The helical content of p8 in these intermediate forms is similar to that in the phage, suggesting that the structural change during assembly may involve just a sliding of the shingled p8 subunits with respect to their neighbours in the assembly.

== Applications ==
=== Life sciences and medicine ===
Ff phages have been engineered for applications in biological and medical sciences. Many applications build on experiments showing that the DNA sequence determining resistance to the antibiotic kanamycin can be inserted in a functional form into the non-coding intergenic sequence of fd phage DNA. Such modified phage are correspondingly longer that wild-type filamentous fd, because the longer DNA is coated with correspondingly more gene 8 coat proteins, but the phage life-cycle is not otherwise disrupted. The traditional “tadpole” or isometric shaped-phage, on the other hand, which have a limited-sized capsid, cannot be so easily used to encapsidate a larger DNA molecule. The modified phage can be selected by infecting kanamycin-sensitive bacteria with modified phage to introduce resistance to kanamycin, and growing the infected bacteria in media containing an otherwise lethal concentration of kanamycin.

This result was extended by inserting foreign DNA expressing a foreign peptide into fd phage gene 3, rather than into the intergenic sequence, so that the foreign peptide appears on the surface of the phage as a part of the gene 3 adsorption protein. Phage carrying the foreign peptide can then be detected using appropriate antibodies. The reverse of this approach is to insert DNA coding for antibodies into gene 3 and detect their presence by appropriate antigens.

These techniques have been extended over the years in many ways, for instance by inserting foreign DNA into the genes coding for phage coat proteins other than gene 3, and/or duplicating the gene of interest to modify only some of the corresponding gene products. Phage display technology has been widely used for many purposes.

=== Material sciences and nanotechnology ===
Ff phages have been engineered for applications such as remediation, electrochemical, photovoltaic, catalytic, sensing and digital memory devices, especially by Angela Belcher and colleagues.

== See also ==
- Filamentous bacteriophage
