= Dübel =

Dübel is a German surname. Notable people with the surname include:

- Arno Dübel (1956–2023), German unemployed man
- Stefan Dübel, German biologist

== See also ==
- Yvonne Dubel, French opera singer
