= Uhry (Königslutter) =

- Ortsteil of Königslutter
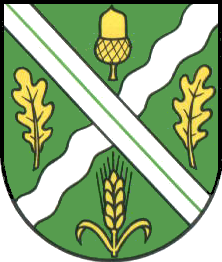
- Coat of arms
- Interactive map of Uhry
- Location within Germany Location within Lower Saxony
- Coordinates: 52°18′N 10°52′E
- Country: Germany
- State: Lower Saxony
- District: Helmstedt
- Town: Königslutter
- Elevation: 130 m (430 ft)

Population (2021)
  - Total: 144
- Time zone: UTC+01:00 (CET)
  - Summer (DST): UTC+02:00 (CEST)
- Postal codes: 38154
- Dialling codes: 05353
- Vehicle registration: HE
- Website: www.koenigslutter.de

Uhry a small village that is part of the city of Königslutter, Lower Saxony, Germany. It lies close to the mountain range of Dorm and is about 35 km east of Braunschweig. The village is on Bundesautobahn 2 (motorway) between Hanover and Berlin. Uhry has 144 residents (2021).

== Facilities ==
Uhry has a small chapel, the Evangelische Freikirche. There is also a sports club, which citizens share with the neighboring village of Beienrode.

== Coat of arms ==
The coat of arms of Uhry was officially accepted by the district president of Lüneburg in 1960. The background is green with a diagonal white stripe divided into two parts by a green line crossed by a diagonal wavy white stripe. In the angles of these are (top) an acorn, on each side are oak leaves, and (bottom) an ear of wheat. The stripes represent the Uhrau stream and the Autobahn A2. The rest of the coat indicates that Uhry is surrounded by forests and arable land.

== Sand extraction ==
A large sand quarry lies in the northeast of Uhry. About 50 million years ago a river delta existed there, and much grit and sand were deposited. The sands are almost 100 percent quartz crystal and are used in the production of microchips.

== Gallery ==
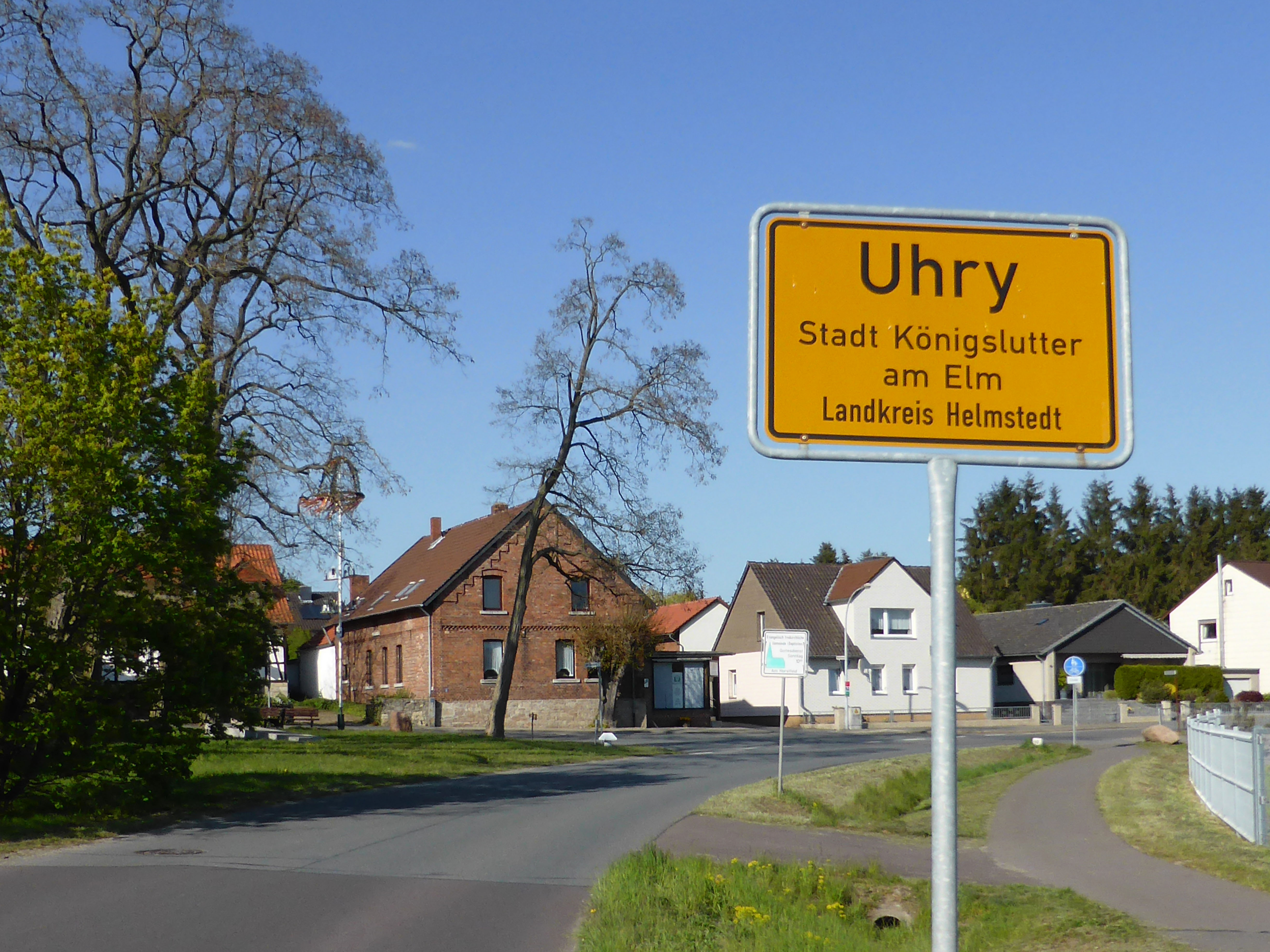
Place-name sign

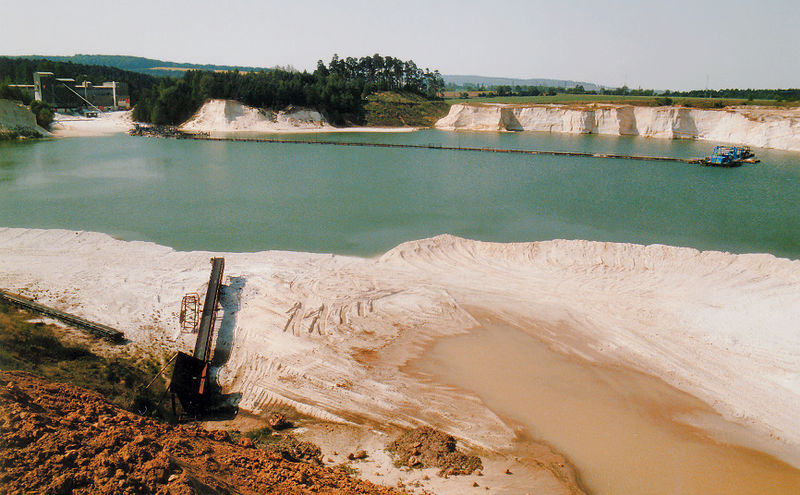
Sand quarry in Uhry, 1988

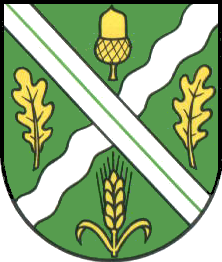
Coat of arms
