= Oxidative coupling of methane =

Chemical Reaction

The oxidative coupling of methane (OCM) is a potential chemical reaction studied in the 1980s for the direct conversion of natural gas, primarily consisting of methane, into value-added chemicals. Although the reaction would have strong economics if practicable, no effective catalysts are known, and thermodynamic arguments suggest none can exist.

== Ethylene production ==
The principal desired product of OCM is ethylene, the world's largest commodity chemical and the chemical industry's fundamental building block. While converting methane to ethylene would offer enormous economic benefits, it is a major scientific challenge. Thirty years of research failed to produce a commercial OCM catalyst, preventing this process from commercial applications.

Ethylene derivatives are found in food packaging, eyeglasses, cars, medical devices, lubricants, engine coolants and liquid crystal displays. Ethylene production by steam cracking consumes large amounts of energy and uses oil and natural gas fractions such as naphtha and ethane.

The oxidative coupling of methane to ethylene is written below:

2CH_{4} + O_{2} → C_{2}H_{4} + 2H_{2}O

The reaction is exothermic (∆H = −280 kJ/mol) and occurs at high temperatures (750–950 ˚C). In the reaction, methane (CH_{4}) is activated heterogeneously on the catalyst surface, forming methyl free radicals, which then couple in the gas phase to form ethane (C_{2}H_{6}). The ethane subsequently undergoes dehydrogenation to form ethylene (C_{2}H_{4}). The yield of the desired C_{2} products is reduced by non-selective reactions of methyl radicals with the surface and oxygen in the gas phase, which produce (undesirable) carbon monoxide and carbon dioxide.

== Catalysis ==
Direct conversion of methane into other useful products is one of the most challenging subjects to be studied in heterogeneous catalysis. Methane activation is difficult because of its thermodynamic stability with a noble gas like electronic configuration. The tetrahedral arrangement of strong C–H bonds (435 kJ/mol) offer no functional group, magnetic moments or polar distributions to undergo chemical attack. This makes methane less reactive than nearly all of its conversion products, limiting efficient utilization of natural gas, the world's most abundant petrochemical resource.

The economic promise of OCM has attracted significant industrial interest. In the 1980s and 1990s multiple research efforts were pursued by academic investigators and petrochemical companies. Hundreds of catalysts have been tested, and several promising candidates were extensively studied. Researchers were unable to achieve the required chemoselectivity for economic operation. Instead of producing ethylene, the majority of methane was non-selectively oxidized to carbon dioxide.

The lack of selectivity was related to the poor C–H activation of known catalysts, requiring high reaction temperatures (750 ˚C and 950 ˚C) to activate the C–H bond. This high reaction temperature establishes a secondary gas-phase reaction mechanism pathway, whereby the desired reaction of methyl radical coupling to C_{2} products (leading to ethylene) strongly competes with CO_{x} side reactions.

The high temperature also presents a challenge for the reaction engineering. Among the process engineering challenges are the requirements for expensive metallurgy, lack of industry experience with high temperature catalytic processes and the potential need for new reactor design to manage heat transfer efficiently.

Labinger postulated an inherent limit to OCM selectivity, concluding that "expecting substantial improvements in the OCM performance might not be wise". Labinger's argument, later demonstrated experimentally by Mazanec et al., is based on the mechanism of methane activation, which is a radical mechanism, forming H and CH3 radicals by the homolytic cleavage of the C–H bond. Ethylene and ethane that are proposed products have C–H bonds of similar strength. Thus, any catalyst that can activate methane can also activate the products. The yield of ethylene (and/or ethane) is limited by the relative rates of the methane and ethylene reactions, and these rates are very similar. Reactions of the products lead to higher homologues, and eventually to aromatics and coke. The same limitation applies to direct pyrolysis of methane, which is also a radical process. Nevertheless, some recent work have shown that the mechanism of the OCM could be initiated by an heterolytic cleavage of the C–H bond on magnesium oxide in the presence of O_{2} atmosphere.

Eventually, the inability to discover a selective catalyst led to a gradual loss of interest in OCM. Beginning in the mid-1990s, research activity in this area began to decline significantly, as evidenced by the decreasing number of patents filed and peer-reviewed publications. The research company Siluria attempted to develop a commercially viable OCM process, but did not succeed. The company sold their OCM technology to McDermott in 2019.
