= MimoDB =

Peptides database

MimoDB 2.0

Content
- Description: mimotope database

Contact
- Research center: University of Electronic Science and Technology of China
- Laboratory: Key Laboratory for Neuroinformation of Ministry of Education
- Authors: Jian Huang
- Primary citation: Huang & al. (2012)
- Release date: 2011

Access
- Website: http://immunet.cn/mimodb

MimoDB is a database of peptides that have been selected from random peptide libraries based on their ability to bind small compounds, nucleic acids, proteins, cells, and tissues through phage display.

== See also ==
- Mimotope
- Phage display
