= Efunaviria =

Virus classification
- (unranked): Virus
- Realm: Efunaviria
- Kingdom: Loebvirae
- Phylum: Hofneiviricota
- Class: Faserviricetes
- Order: Tubulavirales

Subtaxa
- See text

Realm of viruses

Efunaviria is a realm of bacterial viruses (bacteriophages) that encode an FtsK family ATPase and hydrophobic major capsid proteins (MCPs) that are forced out from the host cell membrane during virion assembly and exit from host cells. Efunavirians have circular, positive-sense, single-stranded DNA (ssDNA) genomes. Core proteins encoded by them include the FtsK ATPase, MCPs, and replication-initiator proteins. The extracellular particles (virions) of viruses in Efunaviria are either flexible and filamentous or rigid and rod-like. At the ends of virion are minor capsid proteins involved in host recognition and binding. Efunavirians have been found in a diverse range of bacteria spanning Gram-positive, Gram-negative, and cell-wall-less bacteria.

Efunavirians first infect cells by attaching to the surface of bacteria and translocating their genome into the host cell's cytoplasm. The genome is replicated through various methods, including rolling circle replication and as a byproduct of transposition. At the same time as replication, viral structural and assembly proteins integrate into the cell membrane, forming a pore through which the genome is extruded. During extrusion, virions are formed as viral DNA is ejected through the membrane and MCPs wrap around the genome until the virion dissociates from the membrane. Infection is chronic and extrusion occurs continuously without killing the host. Host interactions have been observed in some efunavirians. For example, some inoviruses encode proteins that alter bacterial virulence, while some others improve the fitness of non-pathogenic bacteria.

Three families of efunavirians have been described: Inoviridae, Paulinoviridae, and Plectroviridae. The inovirus f1, first described in 1960, was the first efunavirian discovered and is the namesake of the realm. Bacteriophages fd and M13 were discovered soon after but later shown to belong to the same species as f1. Since their discovery, filamentous phages like M13 have been studied extensively and are often used in biotechnology and nanotechnology for uses such as phage display. Originally, efunavirians were classified in the realm Monodnaviria in the kingdom Loebvirae, which was created in 2020. In 2026, Monodnaviria was split into four realms corresponding to its four kingdoms after evidence showed that its kingdoms were not related to each other. This gave Loebvirae its own realm, Efunaviria.

== Classification ==
Efunaviria is monotypic down to the rank of its sole order, Tubulavirales, which has three families. This is shown hereafter:

- Realm: Efunaviria
  - Kingdom: Loebvirae
    - Phylum: Hofneiviricota
      - Class: Faserviricetes
        - Order: Tubulavirales
          - Family: Inoviridae
          - Family: Paulinoviridae
          - Family: Plectroviridae

== Characteristics ==
=== Genome ===
Efunavirians have circular, positive-sense, single-stranded DNA (ssDNA) genomes. Inovirus genomes are 5.5–10.6 kilobases (kb) in length and encode 7–15 proteins. The genomes of plectroviruses are 4.5–8.3 kb long and encode 4–13 proteins. Paulinoviruses have smaller genomes and encode fewer predicted proteins than inoviruses and plectroviruses, at 5.6–5.9 kb in length with 8–10 proteins. A unique trait of viruses in the plectrovirus genera Suturavirus and Vespertiliovirus is that the messenger RNA (mRNA) sequence UGA is not a stop codon but encodes tryptophan like in their hosts.

=== Proteins ===
Efunavirians encode a FtsK family ATPase and hydrophobic major capsid proteins (MCPs). For bacteriophage M13, the most widely studied inovirus, extracellular particles (virions) contain 2,700 copies of the MCP. The domains at the start of the MCP's amino acid chain (N-terminus) are negatively charged, hydrophilic, and positioned on the outside of the virion. Its central domains are hydrophobic and stabilize interactions between subunits, and amino acid residues of the domains at the end of its amino acid sequence (C-terminus) interact with DNA phosphate groups of the genome. M13 also encodes minor structural proteins found at the ends of the virion.

The FtsK ATPase pumps viral ssDNA through the cytoplasmic membrane of the host during extrusion from the host cell, using ATP to do so. To do this, FtsK forms hexamers that contain six subunits of the protein. In the region near the N-terminus, there are transmembrane domains. Near the C-terminus, there is a motor that translocates DNA. Between these two areas is a "linker" region. Efunavirians also encode proteins involved in replication, including endonucleases that initiate rolling circle replication. Viruses of the plectrovirus genus Vespertiliovirus encode a transposase that takes the place of the replication-initiator protein encoded by other efunavirians.

=== Structure ===
The virions of efunavirians have either a flexible, filamentous shape or are rigid and rod-like. Virions contain the genome inside a capsid that has helical symmetry. At the ends of the virion are minor capsid proteins involved in host recognition and binding. The main helical part of the capsid is made of MCPs, while the ends (of M13) contain five copies each of four other proteins, two at one end and two at the other end. The mass ratio of proteins and DNA determines virion symmetry, of which there are two types of helical symmetry observed in inoviruses. Virion length depends on genome length and nucleotide rise, so there is no theoretical limit to how much DNA can be packaged into virions.

Inoviruses have filamentous virions that are 6–10 nanometers (nm) in diameter and 600–2,500 nm in length. One end is blunt, and the other end is rounded. Like inoviruses, paulinoviruses have filamentous virions with a diameter of 7–12 nm and a length of 620–830 nm. Plectroviruses have asymmetric, nearly straight, rod-shaped virions 10–16 nm in diameter and 70–280 nm long. One end of the virion is rounded, the other varying in shape. Compared to inoviruses and paulinoviruses, plectroviruses are shorter and wider.

=== Life cycle ===
Efunavirians start infection by first attaching to the exterior of target cells. Using M13 an example, infection starts when the viral protein p3 interacts with the top of a bacterial pilus, which acts as an adhesion receptor. This triggers pilus retraction, bringing the virion closer to the bacterium where it can interact with the TolQRA co-receptor, which functions as the entry receptor. The viral genome is then translocated into the cytoplasm. Some receptors of inoviruses are pili encoded by plasmids, which can be transferred to new bacterial strains laterally, making those bacteria susceptible to infection.

Once inside the cell, the genome is replicated. The replication method of efunavirians varies, but all create intermediate ssDNA molecules. One method, used by inoviruses, paulinoviruses, and some plectroviruses, is rolling circle replication (RCR), which is catalyzed by endonucleases. The most common endonuclease among efunavirians belongs to the Rep_trans family. Some also encode RepL family replication proteins and HUH superfamily endonucleases. Some plectroviruses do not encode replication proteins but instead produce ssDNA intermediates during transposition by DDE superfamily transposases. Genomes may persist extrachromosomally, like a plasmid, or they may be integrated into the host cell's genome, either by a virus-encoded integrase or transposase or by host enzymes.

Efunavirians are not considered to be lytic or lysogenic, because they are released from cells by extrusion, causing a chronic infection without killing the host. At the same time as replication, structural and assembly proteins integrate into the cell membrane, forming a pore for virion extrusion through the membrane. During extrusion, virions are formed as rod-shaped replicative form DNA is ejected through the host cell membrane. MCPs embedded in the membrane wrap around the genome helically, replacing helix destabilizing proteins, until the virion dissociates from the membrane and releases from the cell. One end is extruded first, following by the main helical part of the virion, then the other end. Extrusion occurs continuously during infection while the host cell remains intact and viable. Usually, however, infected cells have reduced growth rates.

== Distribution ==
Efunavirian genomes have been identified across a diverse range of bacteria, infecting Gram-positive, Gram-negative, and cell-wall-less bacteria. Inoviruses, paulinoviruses, and plectroviruses infect different types of bacteria. Inoviruses infect Gram-negative bacteria with a lipopolysaccharide (LPS)-containing outer membrane. Identifies hosts include Escherichia, Salmonella, Pseudomonas, Xanthomonas, Stenotrophomonas, Vibrio, and Ralstonia. Inoviruses are also found as prophages in many bacterial genomes. More than one is usually present in a bacterial strain, sometimes as tandem repeats of 2–4 copies. Paulinoviruses infect bacteria that do not have an LPS-containing outer membrane, such as Actinomycetes and Deinococci. Plectroviruses infect bacteria that do not have a cell wall, namely Mollicutes of the genera Acholeplasma and Spiroplasma.

== Interactions with hosts ==
Some inoviruses encode genes involved in bacterial virulence. An example is the Vibrio bacteriophage CTXphi, which encodes three cholera toxins. Some other inoviruses can decrease virulence, such as viruses of the genus Habenivirus, which infect the plant pathogen Ralstonia solanacearum. Inovirus involvement in bacterial virulence has been suggested for many human, animal, and plant pathogens, affecting traits such as biofilm formation, exopolysaccharide production, and motility. Some inoviruses contribute to the fitness of non-pathogenic bacteria, such as Pseudoalteromonas species, improving their motility and chemotaxis, which benefits their survival in Arctic sea ice. Host interctions have also been observed in plectroviruses. Viruses in the genus Vespertiliviorus alter Spiroplasma genomes by integrating within active genes, destroying their function. This creates targets for site-specific and homologous recombination. Furthermore, for plectroviruses in the genus Suturavirus, integration of viral DNA into host DNA can provide protection from reinfections by the same virus.

== History ==
The first efunavirian discovered was the inovirus f1 of Escherichia coli bacteria, first described in 1960 by T. Loeb. In 1963, Hartmut Hoffmann-Berling and D. A. Martin discovered bacteriophage fd, and Peter Hofschneider discovered phage M13. Later analysis showed that f1, fd, and M13 were almost identical genetically, so they are classified in the same species, Inovirus M13. Since its discovery, M13 has become the most widely studied inovirus. Filamentous phages, especially M13, have often been used in biotechnology and nanotechnology for phage display technology and as cloning vectors (phagemids) in DNA sequencing.

The family Inoviridae was established in 1978, and the family Plectroviridae was established in 2020. The family Paulinoviridae was established in 2021 to re-classify inoviruses that did not show close relation to the rest of Inoviridae. Originally, efunavirians were classified in the realm Monodnaviria in 2020 with other ssDNA viruses that encoded RCR-initiator proteins. Within Monodnaviria, efunavirians were classified in the kingdom Loebvirae. In 2026, Monodnaviria was split into four realms corresponding to its four kingdoms after evidence showed that the kingdoms had separate evolutionary origins. With this split, Loebvirae was moved to its own realm, Efunaviria.

=== Etymology ===
Efunaviria takes its name from the Latin letter "ef" and the Latin number "una", meaning one, referring to phage f1. The second part, -viria, is the suffix used for virus realms. The only kingdom in the realm, Loebvirae, is named after T. Loeb, who described phage f1 in 1960, with the suffix for virus kingdoms, -virae. The realm's only phylum, Hofneiviricota, is named after Peter H. Hofschneider, who described phage M13 in 1963, with the suffix for virus phyla, -viricota. The realm's sole class, Faserviricetes, derives the first part of its name from the German word "Faser", which means fiber. This is a references to inoviruses, which take their name from the Greek word "ίνα" (ína). The second part, -viricetes, is the suffix used for virus classes. Lastly, the realm's only order, Tubulavirales, takes the first part of its name from the Latin words tubula(e), meaning pipe or tube, with the suffix for virus orders, -virales.

== See also ==
- List of higher virus taxa
