= McDermott International =

American multinational engineering, procurement, construction and installation company

Coordinates: 29.781443°N 95.617484°W

McDermott International, Ltd
- Type: Private
- Industry: Energy Engineering and Construction
- Incorporated: Bermuda
- Founded: 1923; 103 years ago
- Founder: Ralph Thomas McDermott
- Headquarters: Houston, Texas, United States
- Key people: Michael McKelvy (President & CEO)
- Number of employees: ~40,000 (2021)

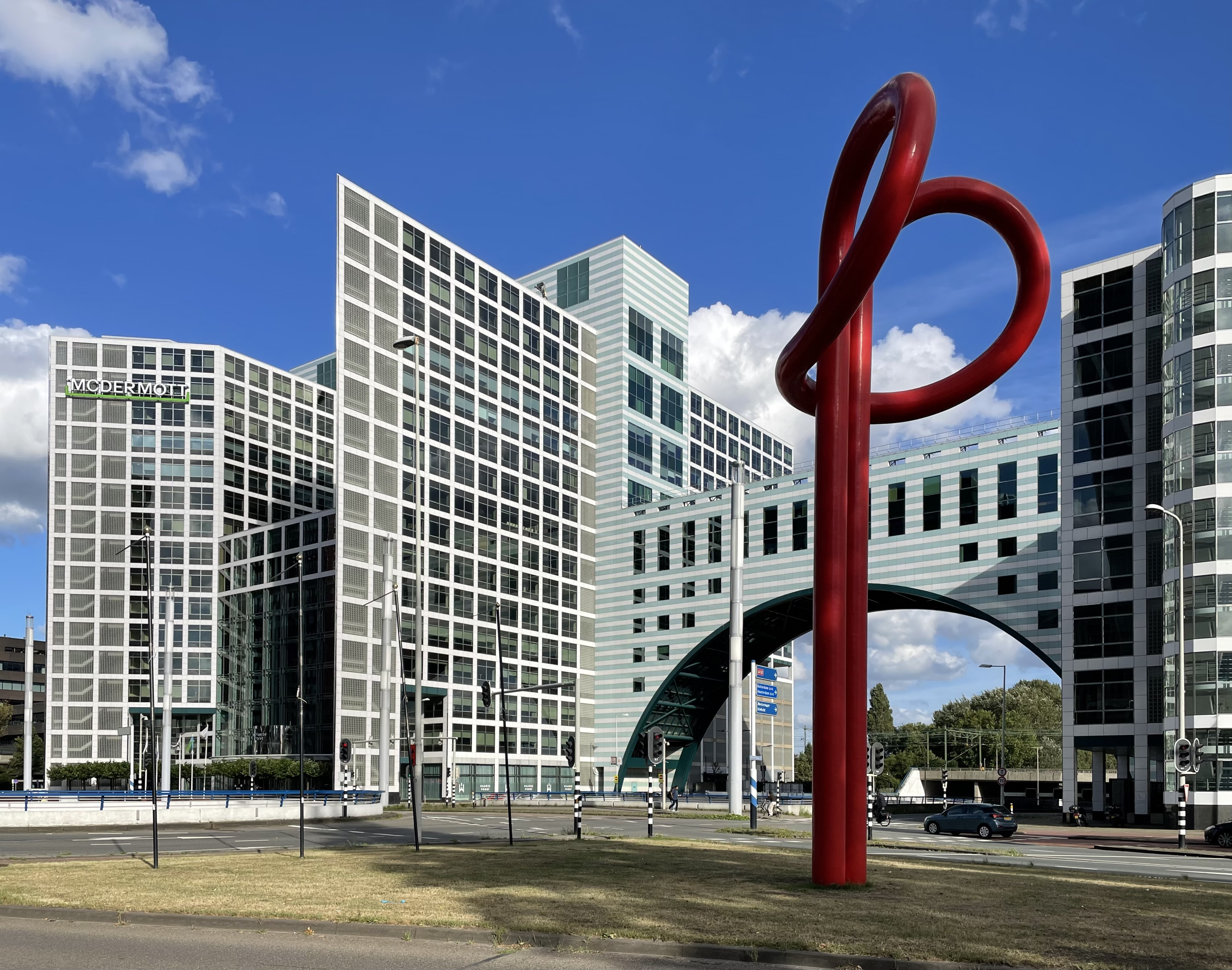
Offices in The Hague, Netherlands

McDermott International, Ltd provides engineering and construction services to the energy industry. Operating in over 54 countries, McDermott has more than 30,000 employees, as well as a fleet of specialty marine construction vessels and fabrication facilities around the world. Incorporated in Bermuda, It is headquartered in the Energy Corridor area of Houston, Texas.

== History ==
In 1923, Ralph Thomas McDermott established J. Ray McDermott & Company Incorporated at the age of 24 upon receipt of a contract to build 50 wooden drilling rigs for a wildcatter in Luling, Texas. Knowing he could benefit from his father's long-time experience in the lumber and oilfield construction businesses, Ralph made John Raymond McDermott a partner and the company's namesake.

In 1930, it expanded the business from its original headquarters in Eastland, Texas, to Luling after a boom in oil exploration in the area. In 1932, the company moved to Houston, Texas with the continuing oil boom. It provided different services to the oil industry through three McDermott family-owned businesses: J. Ray McDermott & Co., Elmax Construction, and Stall & McDermott.

1937 saw the hiring of the company's first construction crew, a team of six. The company opened a New Orleans, Louisiana office. In 1938, the company introduced the first use of floating drilling equipment in low-lying marshlands of Texas and Louisiana. The following year, it purchased J.G. McMullen Dredging Company and established it as the Olsen Dredging Company.

In 1946, the company reorganized the multiple McDermott family business operations into one: J. Ray McDermott & Co., Inc. of Delaware. The following year, the company designed and installed the first fixed platform made of steel out-of-sight-of-land, in 20 feet of water in the Gulf of Mexico for Superior Oil. It also established a contracting division, which was the major operating segment during the early years.

In 1948, it acquired assets of Harry F. Allsman Company, McDermott's joint venture partner for several contracting jobs in the Gulf of Mexico, which provided equipment to meet the new demand for offshore construction. In 1950, the company was commissioned the construction of the first vessel designed specifically for offshore work (Derrick Barge 4). The company's Oil Division was also organized.

=== Becoming McDermott International ===
In 2010, McDermott International share-holders agreed to spin off the U.S.-based government contracting services company Babcock & Wilcox and its related other domestic companies. The oil & gas services company, J. Ray McDermott, discontinued use of the J. Ray McDermott brand; and continued its oil & gas services contracting under the name McDermott International.

=== 2017–2018 ===
On December 18, 2017, CB&I and McDermott agreed to combine and form a fully vertically integrated onshore-offshore company. The merger was approved in May 2018. In March 2018, the company announced that it had new business with Baker Hughes and BP, with David Dickson still CEO. CB&I's stock ceased being listed on the NYSE on May 11, 2018. Gary P. Luquette was the chairman of the combined company. In May 2018 the company became a member of the S&P MidCap 400, replacing Diebold Nixdorf.

In August 2018, McDermott signed a contract with Shell to work on the Perdido development in the Gulf of Mexico. Also, that month, the company was sued by TechnipFMC over allegedly stolen trade secrets.

=== Post combination ===
After the combination, LNG projects in Hackberry, LA & Freeport, TX and Power projects experienced challenges and the company sold a portion of its pipe fabrication operations.

McDermott secured a $1.7B credit deal. This deal carries super senior credit terms that are structured with the "kind of terms they would receive if they were to convert their debt to a debtor-in-possession loan in bankruptcy."

The company purchased Siluria Technologies, which developed oxidative coupling of methane processes, in 2019.

=== Restructuring ===
On January 21, 2020, McDermott announced that it had filed for Chapter 11 bankruptcy, cancelling all shares of common stock.

The bankruptcy case was filed as prepackaged restructuring in the United States District Court for the Southern District of Texas and includes the parent company, McDermott International, Inc. and 247 affiliated companies. The primary case is identified as case number 20-30336.

In six months, McDermott emerged from Chapter 11 bankruptcy with a new structure and strategy in June 2020..

=== Fueling the Energy Transition ===
McDermott emerged from restructuring positioned to continue to meet client needs as the industry shifted. It saw a significant increase in opportunities to apply its technical expertise to achieve the Energy Transition as operators made—and then worked to meet—carbon reduction goals. McDermott secured front-end engineering and design projects from Michelin Group.

The company was tapped to provide EPC services for Tennet’s offshore grid connection project: BorWin6 980MW high-voltage, direct current (HVDC).

Secured contract to deliver EPC services of power-to-gas facility in New Jersey.

Under a contract with Viva Energy Australia, McDermott delivers FEED services for a new modularized production unit that will produce ultra-low sulfur gasoline to meet the proposed changes to Australia's fuel quality standards from the end of 2024.

In 2022, McDermott joined a group of industry experts focused on unlocking the potential for a hydrogen-led energy hub located at Bacton, Norfolk, UK. The project could play a significant role in the UK's energy future and become a vital element in its transition to net zero emissions. The project aims to deliver a sustainable hydrogen supply by adding facilities that support low-carbon hydrogen production, carbon capture and underground storage (CCUS) by 2030.

McDermott’s newly upgraded ultra deep water Amazon vessel was christened in 2022 and secures subsea contract for the Whale Development in Alaminos Canyon. The upgraded specifications enable highly automated operations, the production of hex joints from single or double joints using an onboard multi-joint facility and a pipe hold capacity of 10,000 metric tons. Its increased level of automation also enables a significant reduction in the crew numbers required to safely perform pipelay operations.

Operational Structure and Leadership McDermott implemented a new company strategy, which focused its expertise into three business lines: Low Carbon Solutions, Offshore Middle East and Subsea and Floating Facilities.

Michael McKelvy joins McDermott as President and CEO in February of 2022 from Gilbane Building Company.

In October 2023, McDermott announced a Transaction Support Agreement to further position the company for long-term success. Under the terms of the agreement, McDermott will amend and extend its term loans and LC facilities for three years, through mid-2027 with no change in pricing, increase the company's liquidity, and discharge certain legacy legal liabilities.

To implement the Agreement, McDermott International Holdings B.V. and Lealand Finance Company B.V. initiated processes in the Netherlands under the Dutch Act on Confirmation of Extrajudicial Plans (Wet Homologatie Onderhands Akkoord or "WHOA"). CB&I UK Limited will initiate a Restructuring Plan under Part 26A of the Companies Act 2006 (UK) in England.

== McDermott Today ==
Today, McDermott International operates as a global provider of integrated engineering, procurement, fabrication, construction and installation services for the energy industry. The company executes complex onshore, offshore, subsea and floating infrastructure and low-carbon projects. Its globally-integrated resources include more than 30,000 employees, centralized engineering and project management with regional fabrication yards, marine assets and in‑country project execution capabilities.

McDermott maintains operations in more than 30 countries across major energy regions including the Americas, the Middle East, Asia‑Pacific, Europe and Africa, supporting both conventional energy developments and emerging low‑carbon infrastructure, with a focus on project in LNG, HVDC, sustainable aviation fuels, carbon capture and storage and hydrogen. Headquartered in Houston, Texas, McDermott continues to deliver large‑scale energy infrastructure projects worldwide through long‑term relationships with national oil companies and international energy majors.

== Marine fleet ==
As of 2025, the company had eight marine vessels.

- Amazon
- Derrick Barge 30
- Derrick Barge 32
- Derrick Barge 50
- Derrick Lay Vessel 2000
- Intermac 650
- Lay Vessel 108
- North Ocean 102
