= Silurian (disambiguation) =

The Silurian is the geological period and system lasting roughly from 445 million years ago to 415 million years ago.

Silurian may also refer to:

- Silurian, the society, culture, language, and ethnicity of the Silures, an ancient Welsh tribe
- Silurian, the racehorse that won the 1923 Doncaster Cup
- The Silurians Press Club, a society established at 1924 by a group of veteran journalists.
- Silurian (Doctor Who), a fictional race of humanoid reptiles who existed before humanity
  - Doctor Who and the Silurians, a Doctor Who serial
- Silurian hypothesis, a thought experiment that speculates if a prior advanced civilization on Earth would leave behind present day evidence of its existence
- Silurian Hills, a small range of hills in the Mojave Desert
- Siluria Technologies, a San Francisco-based technology company
- Eriopygodes imbecilla, the Silurian, a moth of the family Noctuidae
