= Mimotope =

A mimotope is often a peptide, and mimics the structure of an epitope. Because of this property it causes an antibody response similar to the one elicited by the epitope. An antibody for a given epitope antigen will recognize a mimotope which mimics that epitope. Mimotopes are commonly obtained from phage display libraries through biopanning. Vaccines utilizing mimotopes are being developed. Mimotopes are a kind of peptide aptamers.

When the term mimotope was coined by Mario Geysen in 1986, it was used to describe peptides mimicking epitopes. However, this concept has been extended to refer peptide mimic of all types of binding sites. As the mimic of binding site, mimotope analysis has been widely used in mapping epitopes, identifying drug target and inferring protein interaction networks. Furthermore, mimotope has also shown its potential in the development of new diagnostics, therapeutics and vaccines. In addition, special affinities mediated by mimotopes to various semiconductors and other materials have shown very encouraging promise in new material and new energy studies. Gathering information on mimotopes into a special database therefore deserves. In 2010, the MimoDB database version 1.0 was released. It had 10716 peptides grouped into 1229 sets. These peptides were extracted from biopanning results of phage-displayed random peptide libraries reported in 571 papers. The MimoDB database has been updated to the current version 2.0 very recently. In version 2.0, it has 15633 peptides collected from 849 papers and grouped into 1818 sets. Besides the core data on panning experiments and their results, broad background information on target, template, library and structure is included. An accompanied benchmark has also been compiled for bioinformaticians to develop and evaluate their new models, algorithms and programs. In addition, the MimoDB database provides tools for simple and advanced searches, structure visualization, BLAST and alignment view on the fly. The experimental biologists can easily use the database as a virtual control to exclude possible target-unrelated peptides. The MimoDB database is freely available.
