= CTXφ bacteriophage =

Vibrio virus CTXphi

Virus classification
- (unranked): Virus
- Realm: Monodnaviria
- Kingdom: Loebvirae
- Phylum: Hofneiviricota
- Class: Faserviricetes
- Order: Tubulavirales
- Family: Inoviridae
- Genus: Affertcholeramvirus
- Species: Vibrio virus CTXphi

Filamentous bacteriophage

The CTXφ bacteriophage is a filamentous bacteriophage. It is a positive-strand DNA virus with single-stranded DNA (ssDNA).

CTXφ infects some strains of Vibrio cholerae, the bacterium that causes cholera. It carries the genes for cholera toxin (CTX), which makes cholera especially virulent. It can carry genes from one V. cholerae strain to another.

== Genetic material ==
CTXφ is generally present and integrated into the genome of the V. cholerae bacterium, and more rarely in a virion from outside the bacterium. While integrated into the bacterial genome, CTX prophages are found on each of the two chromosomes (in the O1 serogroup of V. cholerae) or arranged in tandem on the larger chromosome (in the El Tor biotype of V. cholerae). The genome of CTXφ is 7 kb long and consists of two regions. The core region, which is approximately 4,6 kb long, contains 5 genes that are associated with phage assembly and morphogenisis (psh, cep, pIIICTX, ace, zot) and two non structural genes. The two non structural genes encoded in the core region of the phage are ctxA and ctxB which are the genes encoding for the Cholera Toxin (CT). The RS2 region, which measures 2,4 kb, contains genes that control the replication, regulation, and integration of CTXφ. The three genes encoded in the RS2 region are rstR, rstA and rstB.

== Insertion, replication, and release from host cell ==
The insertion of the CTXφ genetic material into the V. cholerae bacterium is mediated by two receptors. The first is the toxin-coregulated pilus (TCP), which also aids the bacterium in adhering to the intestinal cell wall. The TCP is thought to bind to the minor CTXφ coat protein OrfU. The second is the TolQRA membrane protein structure.

These requirements for phage membrane binding are quite similar to those of the Ff phages, which infects the bacterium Escherichia coli and requires the F pilus along with the TolQRA structure. In E. coli, the TolQRA acts to translocate the Ff phage into the periplasmic space, where a possible membrane fusion event leads to the insertion of the Ff genome into the E. coli cytoplasm. A similar mechanism is suspected in the injection of the CTXφ genetic material into the V. cholerae cell, though further research is needed to confirm this.

After ssDNA insertion into the V. cholerae cytoplasm, a complementary strand of DNA is formed in order to create the plasmid form of the viral genome, pCTX. pCTX can undergo DNA replication to create new ssDNA genomes and/or be incorporated into the bacterial genome as a prophage. Because this prophage can be present in tandem in some biotypes of V. cholerae, horizontal gene transfer and vertical transmission of the added CTXφ genes are not mutually exclusive.

After the production of the proteins and genomic material necessary to create new virion forms of the bacteriophage, the proteins assemble at a membranous protein complex, the EpsD secretin. Once the new ssDNA genome is inside the assembled proteins, the CTXφ virion detaches from the EpsD and is free to infect other bacteria. Phage particles are secreted from bacterial cells without lysis.

== Non-CT toxins ==
Recent research suggests that at least two toxins other than CT are produced from genes of the CTXφ genome. The first of these is accessory cholera enterotoxin (Ace). Ace is currently thought to be a minor coat protein of virion stage CTXφ, though the process by which the toxin could be released from the protein coat has not yet been identified. The second non-CT toxin encoded within the CTXφ genome is zonula occludens toxin (Zot). Zot, though absolutely essential for the production of the CTXφ virion, is not actually present in the phage particle. The part that Ace and Zot play in the virulence of cholera is still quite unclear.
