= Stefan Dübel =

German biologist

Stefan Dübel (German pronunciation: [ˈʃtɛfaːn ˈdyːbl̩]; born 13 January 1960 in Hanau, Hesse) is a German biologist. From October 2002 to September 2026, he was full professor at the University of Braunschweig and head of the Biotechnology Department of the Institute of Biochemistry, Biotechnology and Bioinformatics. His work is centred around protein engineering, phage display and recombinant antibodies.

== Biography ==
Dübel studied biology at the Johannes Gutenberg University in Mainz and at the Ruprecht-Karls University in Heidelberg from 1978 to 1983. He subsequently completed his civil service. From 1986 to 1989 he was promoted Dr. rer. nat. with a thesis titled: Cell Cycle Regulation and Cell Differentiation in the Coelenterate Hydra at the Centre for Molecular Biology at the University of Heidelberg. Subsequently, he was a postdoctoral fellow at the German Cancer Research Center and at the Institute of Cell Biology and Immunology at the University of Stuttgart. From 1996 to 2001 he was group leader at the Department of Molecular Genetics at the University of Heidelberg, where he achieved his habilitation in the lab of Ekkehard Bautz in 1997. From 2001 to 2002 he was CSO of LifeBits AG.

== Scientific work ==
Dübel's most important work was, together with Frank Breitling, his contributions to the development of phage display for the production of human antibodies, in particular the use of phagemids for antibody phage display which still is the standard approach today. He co-pioneered in vitro antibody selection technologies, resulting in several inventions including antibody phage display, human antibody libraries ) and antibody libraries with randomised CDRs. His lab continued to contribute multiple innovations to Recombinant antibodies, therapeutic antibodies, phage display, ORFeome display, animal-free antibody generation and in vitro evolution, e.g. Hyperphage technology (2001), ORFeome display (2006), and targeted RNases for cancer therapy (1995/2008). Further achievements include the development of the world's first protein knock down mouse using intrabodies (2014), a universal allosteric switch module for antibody affinity (2017) and multiclonal antibodies (2019). In 2020, he was one of the initiators of CORAT (Corona Antibody Team) which aims to cure COVID-19 with neutralizing antibodies against SARS-CoV-2.

== Awards and honours ==
- 2015 Innovation in Biotechnology Award of the American Association of Pharmaceutical Scientists
- 2016 Technology Transfer Prize of the IHK Braunschweig
- 2019 Innovation Award of the German BioRegions for the tick vaccine
- 2020 Two Innovation Awards of the State of Lower Saxony for Abcalis and Corat
- 2022 ECEAE Prize for animal-free antibodies
- 2026 Replication Prize of the US National Institutes of Health (NIH) (with international team)

== Bibliography ==
- Breitling, Frank; Dübel, Stefan (1999). Recombinant Antibodies. New York: John Wiley and Sons. ISBN 0-471-17847-0.
- Kontermann, Roland; Dübel, Stefan (2010). Antibody Engineering (2 Volumes) (2nd ed.). Heidelberg, New York: Springer Verlag. ISBN 978-3-642-01143-6.
- Dübel, Stefan; Reichert, Janice M (2014). Handbook of therapeutic antibodies. Vol. 1 : Defining the right antibody composition (2nd ed.). Weinheim, Germany: Wiley Blackwell. ISBN 978-3-11-914512-1.
- Dübel, Stefan; Reichert, Janice M (2014). Handbook of therapeutic antibodies. Vol. 2, Clinical development of antibodies (2nd ed.). Weinheim, Germany: Wiley Blackwell. ISBN 978-3-527-32937-3.
- Dübel, Stefan; Reichert, Janice M (2014). Handbook of therapeutic antibodies Vol. 3. Approved therapeutic antibodies (2nd ed.). Weinheim, Germany: Wiley Blackwell. ISBN 978-3-527-32937-3.
- Dübel, Stefan; Hust, Michael; Frenzel, André; Schirrmann, Thomas; Breitling, Frank (2019). Rekombinante Antikörper (in German) (2nd ed.). Berlin: Springer. ISBN 978-3-662-50275-4.
- Dübel, Stefan; Heuser, Stefan M (2025). How Metaphors shape Biotechnology (in German). Berlin, Germany: DeGruyter. ISBN 978-3-119-14512-1.

These are the top 5 most cited papers authored or co-author by Dübel:

- Bradbury, Andrew R M; Sidhu, Sachdev; Dübel, Stefan; McCafferty, John (March 2011). "Beyond natural antibodies: the power of in vitro display technologies". Nature Biotechnology. 29 (3): 245–254. doi:10.1038/nbt.1791. PMC 3057417. PMID 21390033.
- Breitling, Frank; Dübel, Stefan; Seehaus, Thomas; Klewinghaus, Iris; Little, Melvyn (August 1991). "A surface expression vector for antibody screening". Gene. 104 (2): 147–153. doi:10.1016/0378-1119(91)90244-6. PMID 1916287.
- Rondot, Susanne; Koch, Joachim; Breitling, Frank; Dübel, Stefan (January 2001). "A helper phage to improve single-chain antibody presentation in phage display". Nature Biotechnology. 19 (1): 75–78. doi:10.1038/83567. PMID 11135557. S2CID 37191398.
- Taussig, Michael J; Stoevesandt, Oda; Borrebaeck, Carl A K; Bradbury, Andrew R; Cahill, Dolores; Cambillau, Christian; de Daruvar, Antoine; Dübel, Stefan; Eichler, Jutta; Frank, Ronald; Gibson, Toby J; Gloriam, David; Gold, Larry; Herberg, Friedrich W; Hermjakob, Henning; Hoheisel, Jörg D; Joos, Thomas O; Kallioniemi, Olli; Koegl, Manfred; Konthur, Zoltán; Korn, Bernhard; Kremmer, Elisabeth; Krobitsch, Sylvia; Landegren, Ulf; van der Maarel, Silvère; McCafferty, John; Muyldermans, Serge; Nygren, Per-Åke; Palcy, Sandrine; Plückthun, Andreas; Polic, Bojan; Przybylski, Michael; Saviranta, Petri; Sawyer, Alan; Sherman, David J; Skerra, Arne; Templin, Markus; Ueffing, Marius; Uhlén, Mathias (January 2007). "ProteomeBinders: planning a European resource of affinity reagents for analysis of the human proteome". Nature Methods. 4 (1): 13–17. doi:10.1038/nmeth0107-13. PMID 17195019. S2CID 52873745.
- Fuchs, Patrick; Breitling, Frank; Dübel, Stefan; Seehaus, Thomas; Little, Melvyn (December 1991). "Targeting Recombinant Antibodies to the Surface of Escherichia coli: Fusion to a Peptidoglycan Associated Lipoprotein". Bio/Technology. 9 (12): 1369–1372. doi:10.1038/nbt1291-1369. PMID 1367769. S2CID 26946304.
