= PelB leader sequence =

Sequence of amino acids

The pelB leader sequence is a sequence of amino acids which, when attached to a protein, directs the protein to the bacterial periplasm, where the sequence is removed by a signal peptidase. Specifically, pelB refers to pectate lyase B of Erwinia carotovora CE. The leader sequence consists of the 22 N-terminal amino acid residues. This leader sequence can be attached to any other protein (on the DNA level) resulting in a transfer of such a fused protein to the periplasmic space of Gram-negative bacteria, such as Escherichia coli, often used in genetic engineering. Protein secretion can increase the stability of cloned gene products. For instance it was shown that the half-life of the recombinant proinsulin is increased 10-fold when the protein is secreted to the periplasmic space. (vijji. Narne, R.S.Ramya)

One of pelB's possible applications is to direct coat protein-antigen fusions to the cell surface for the construction of engineered bacteriophages for the purpose of phage display.

The Pectobacterium carotovorum pelB leader sequence commonly used in molecular biology has the sequence MKYLLPTAAAGLLLLAAQPAMA (UniProt Q04085).
