= Arno Dübel =

German unemployed man (1956–2023)

- Born: 13 January 1956; Bornum am Elm, Lower Saxony, West Germany
- Died: 23 May 2023 (aged 67); Hamburg, Germany
- Known for: Decades-long unemployment

Arno Dübel (13 January 1956 – 23 May 2023) was a German man that gained notoriety for his decades-long unemployment.

Dübel was born on 13 January 1956 in Bornum am Elm. He began an apprenticeship as a painter but dropped out in 1976 and lived on unemployment benefits since then.

Dübel actively advertised his unwillingness to find work and went to great lengths to avoid sanctions for not working, taking part in talk shows promoting his lifestyle and even unsuccessfully trying to start a career as a schlager music singer with a song about his lack of employment.

His demonstrated abuse of the social security system in Germany made him a target for yellow journalism, with German tabloid Bild calling him "Germany's most insolent unemployed" and using him as an example of alleged widespread fraud of the welfare system.

Dübel died in Hamburg on 23 May 2023, at the age of 67.
