= Königslutter =

- Town
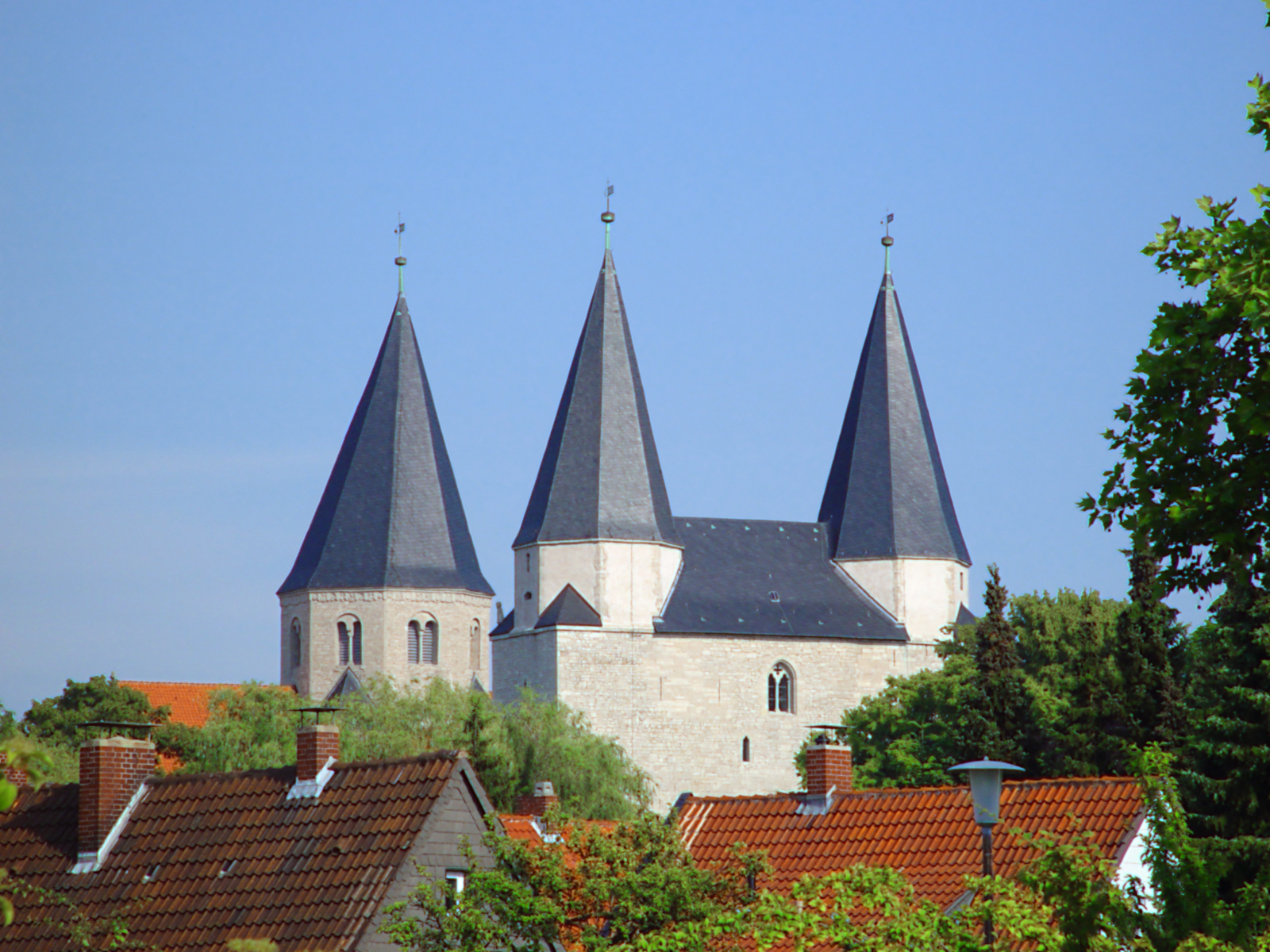
- Old town and monastery church (Kaiserdom)

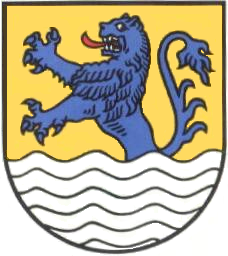
- Coat of arms

- Location of Königslutter within Helmstedt district
- Interactive map of Königslutter
- Location within Germany Location within Lower Saxony
- Coordinates: 52°15′N 10°49′E
- Country: Germany
- State: Lower Saxony
- District: Helmstedt
- First mentioned: 1135
- Subdivisions: 18 Stadtteile

Government
  - Mayor (2019–24): Alexander Hoppe (SPD)

Area
  - Total: 131.12 km^{2} (50.63 sq mi)
- Elevation: 134 m (440 ft)

Population (2025-12-31)
  - Total: 15,293
  - Density: 116.63/km^{2} (302.08/sq mi)
- Time zone: UTC+01:00 (CET)
  - Summer (DST): UTC+02:00 (CEST)
- Postal codes: 38154
- Dialling codes: 05353
- Vehicle registration: HE
- Website: www.koenigslutter.de

Königslutter am Elm (German pronunciation: [køːnɪçsˈlʊtɐ ʔam ˈʔɛlm], lit. 'Königslutter on the Elm') is a town in the district of Helmstedt in Lower Saxony, Germany.

== Geography ==
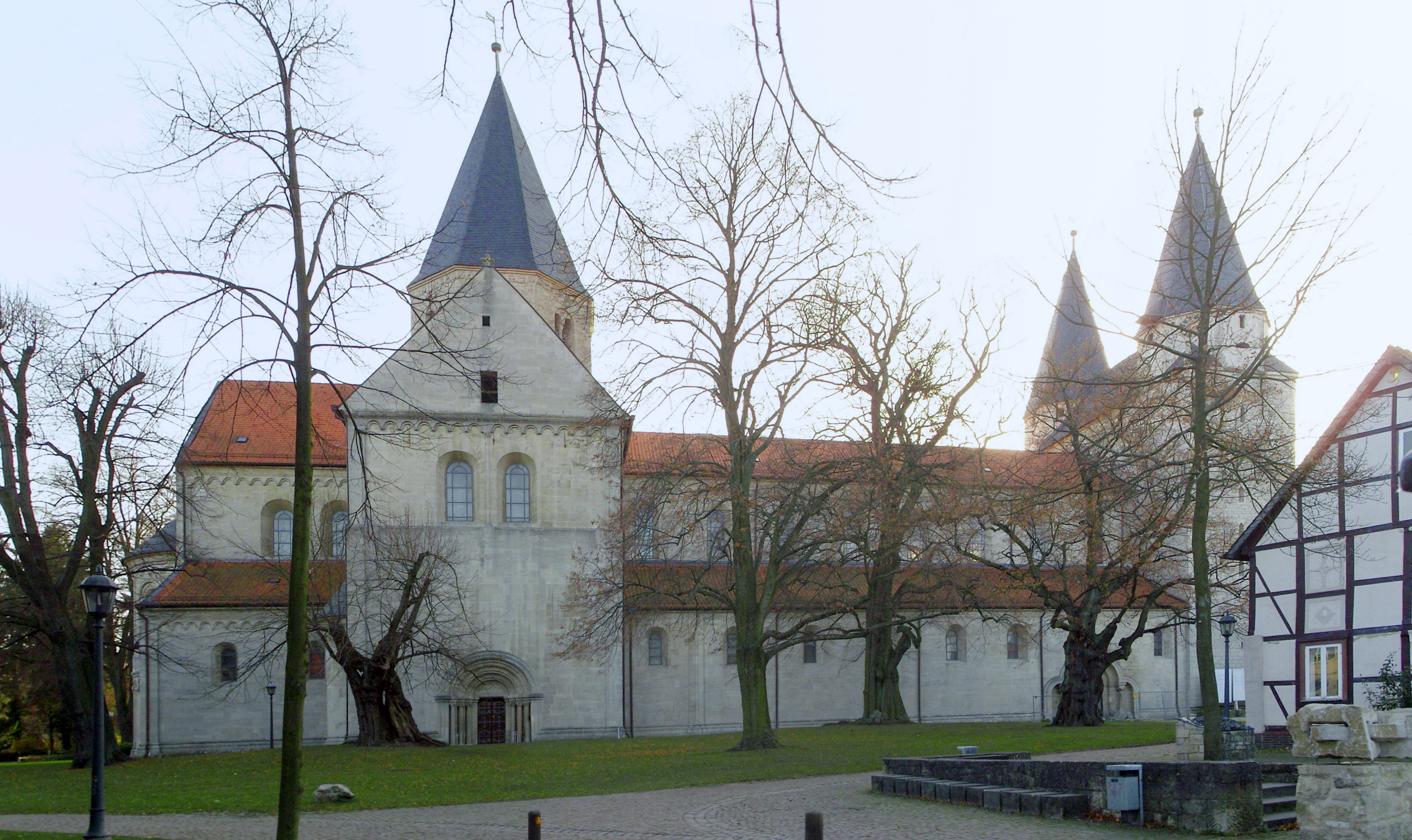
Kaiserdom

It is located on the northeastern slopes of the Elm hill range, within the Elm-Lappwald Nature Park, about 23 km (14 mi) east of Brunswick, 15 km (9.3 mi) west of the district capital Helmstedt, and 20 km (12 mi) south of Wolfsburg.

The town has access to the Brunswick–Magdeburg railway at the Königslutter railway station, served by Regionalbahn trains to Brunswick and Helmstedt, and is traversed by the Bundesstraße 1 federal highway. The Bundesautobahn 2 runs about 6 km (3.7 mi) north of the town centre. Königslutter is a stop on the German Timber-Frame Road (Deutsche Fachwerkstraße) tourist route.

In its current form, the township with about 16,000 inhabitants was created in a 1974 administrative reform by joining the following 18 municipalities:

- Beienrode
- Boimstorf
- Bornum am Elm
- Glentorf
- Groß Steinum
- Klein Steimke
- Königslutter
- Lauingen
- Lelm
- Ochsendorf
- Rhode
- Rieseberg
- Rotenkamp
- Rottorf
- Scheppau
- Schickelsheim
- Sunstedt
- Uhry

== History ==
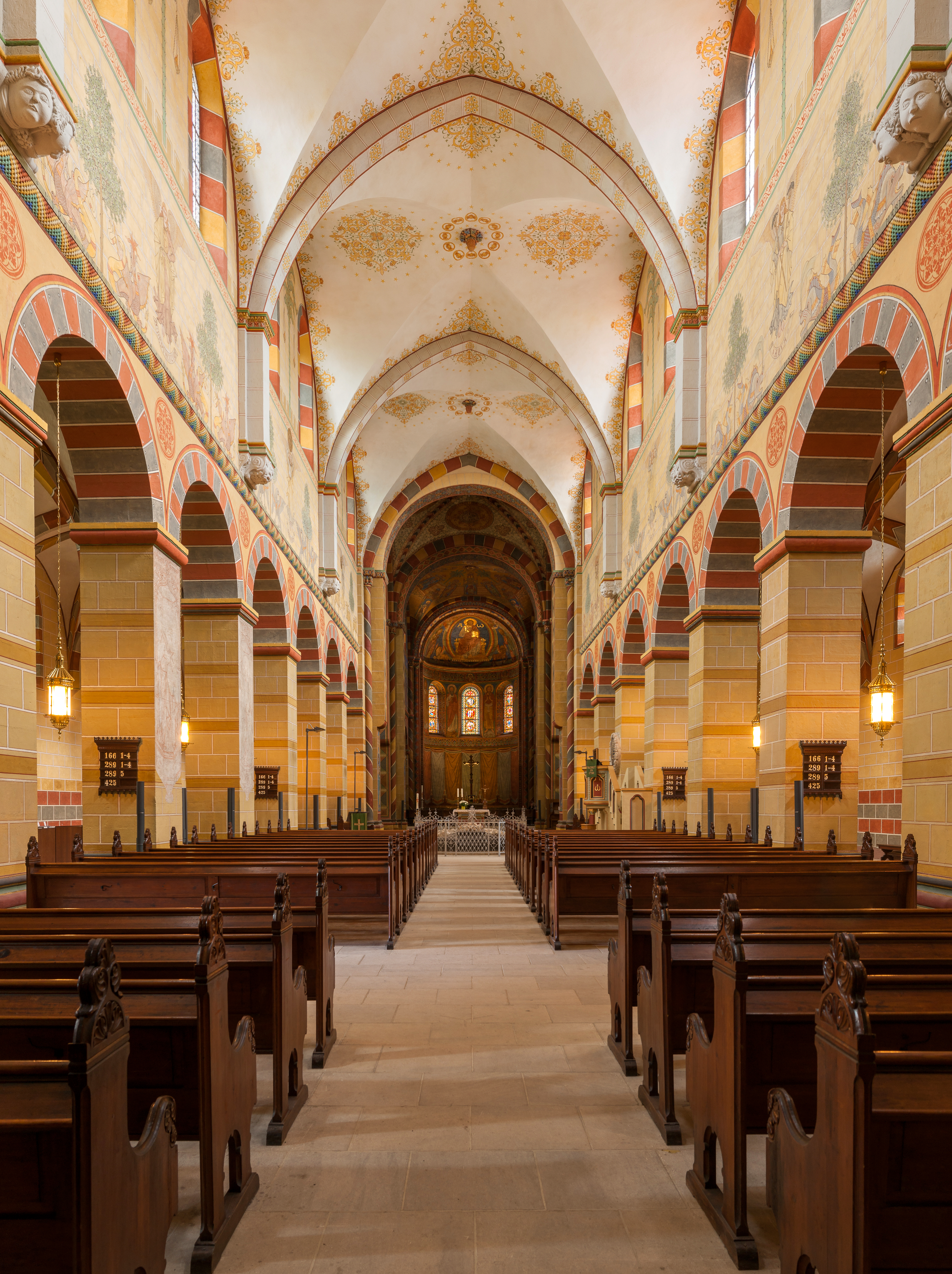
Church interior

A village called Lûtere in the Duchy of Saxony was first mentioned in an 1135 deed, when Emperor Lothair III established a Benedictine monastery here, centered on the Sts Peter and Paul Church, a prominent Romanesque basilica where he and his consort Richenza of Northeim as well as his son-in-law, the Welf duke Henry the Proud are also buried. The place was named after the nearby karst spring of the Lutter (from Middle High German: lauter, "pure") stream in the Elm hills.

A water castle was erected around 1200 and in 1318 the surrounding settlement was documented as a market town. Around 1400 the Dukes of Brunswick granted the citizens of Luttere town privileges. From the late 14th century onwards, the place was called Konnigesluttere, referring to late Emperor Lothair III, King of the Romans.

Located on the trade route from Brunswick to Magdeburg (the present-day Bundesstraße 1), beer brewing and Elm limestone mining and cutting were its main industries in early modern times, while the monastery developed as a pilgrimage destination. Not until 1924, the monastery complex and the adjacent settlement of Oberlutter were incorporated into the town. The monastery church is known for its sculptural art and the tomb of the emperor.

== Politics ==
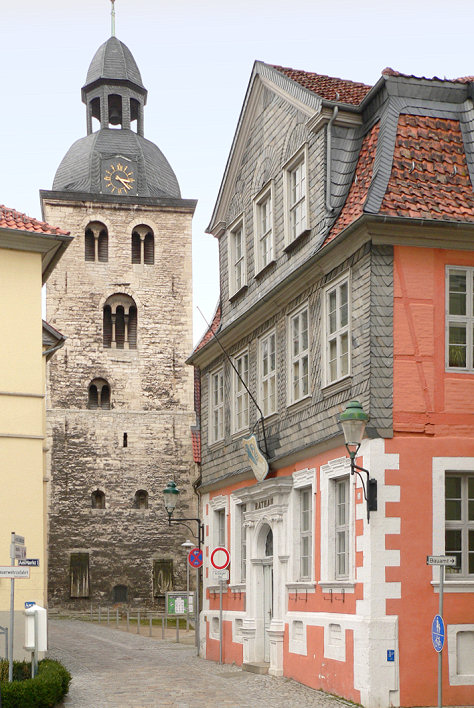
St Sebastian Church and town hall

Seats in the town's assembly (Rat) as of 2011 local elections:

- Christian Democratic Union (CDU): 15
- Social Democratic Party of Germany (SPD): 14
- Free Voters: 2
- Free Democratic Party (FDP): 1
- Alliance 90/The Greens: 1

In 2013 the assembly has voted to enter in merger negotiations with neighbouring Wolfsburg.

=== Mayors ===
Since November 2011 Alexander Hoppe (SPD) is the mayor of Königslutter. Former mayors:

1. Walter Lüders (1948–1949)
2. Friedrich Schmook (1949–1953)
3. Karl Köhler (1953–1954)
4. Friedrich Schmook (1954–1956)
5. Karl Köhler (1956–1968)
6. Otto Schwarzbach (1968–1972)
7. Frieda Fricke (1972–1973)
8. Gustav Uhde (1973–1974)
9. Helmut Albrecht (1974–1976)
10. Alfred Küchenthal (1976–1981)
11. Helmut Albrecht (1981–1986)
12. Alfred Küchenthal (1986–1996)
13. Arnulf Baumann (1996–2001)
14. Margot Albrecht (2001–2002)
15. Ottomar Lippelt (2002–2011)
16. Alexander Hoppe (since 2011)

== Twin towns ==
Königslutter is twinned with the following towns:

- Gommern, Germany, since 1990
- (United Kingdom) Taunton, England, since 1992
- Opalenica, Poland, since 1998

== Notable people ==
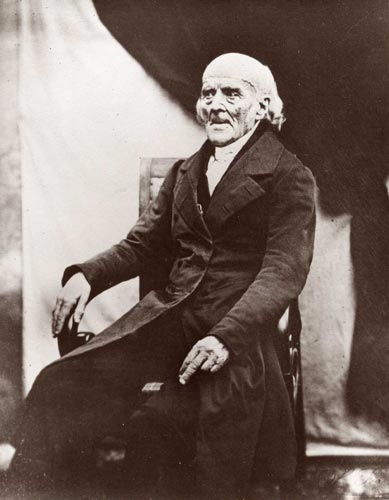
Samuel Hahnemann in 1841

- Werner Schrader (1895–1944), teacher, officer and resistance fighter against the Nazi regime
- Samuel Hahnemann (1755–1843), physician and pioneer of homeopathy, who lived in Königslutter from 1796 to 1799
- Thilo Maatsch (1900–1983), Bauhaus artist, spent his retirement here
