= Biopanning =

Biopanning is an affinity selection technique which selects for peptides that bind to a given target. All peptide sequences obtained from biopanning using combinatorial peptide libraries have been stored in a special freely available database named BDB. This technique is often used for the selection of antibodies too.

Biopanning involves 4 major steps for peptide selection. The first step is to have phage display libraries prepared. This involves inserting foreign desired gene segments into a region of the bacteriophage genome, so that the peptide product will be displayed on the surface of the bacteriophage virion. The most often used are genes pIII or pVIII of bacteriophage M13. The next step is the capturing step. It involves conjugating the phage library to the desired target. This procedure is termed panning. It utilizes the binding interactions so that only specific peptides presented by bacteriophage are bound to the target. For example, selecting antibody presented by bacteriophage with coated antigen in microtiter plates.

The washing step comes after the capturing step to wash away the unbound phages from solid surface. Only the bound phages with strong affinity are kept. The final step involves the elution step where the bound phages are eluted through changing of pH or other environment conditions.

The result is the peptides produced by bacteriophage are specific. The resulting filamentous phages can infect gram-negative bacteria once again to produce phage libraries. The cycle can occur many times resulting with strong affinity binding peptides to the target.
