= Phage major coat protein =

Phage coat Gp8
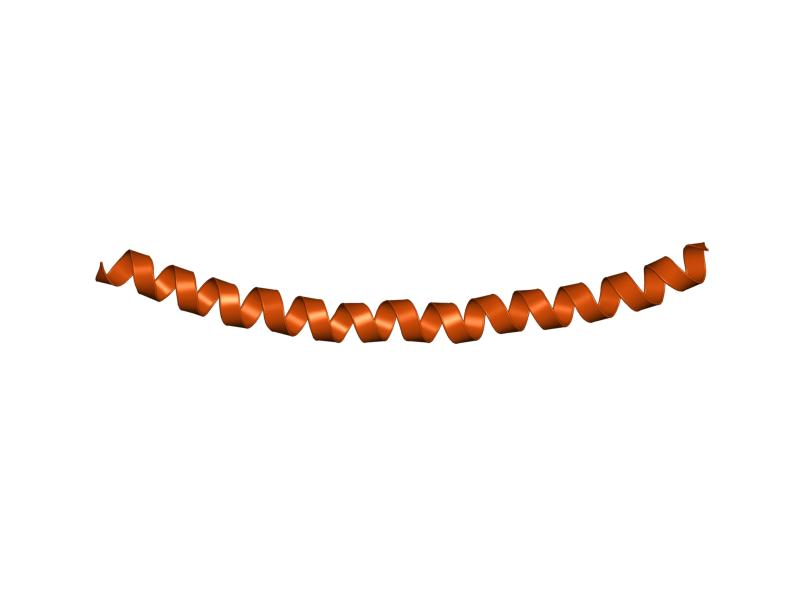
- Single subunit of coat protein

Identifiers
- Symbol: Phage_Coat_Gp8
- Pfam: PF05371
- Pfam clan: CL0371
- InterPro: IPR008020
- SCOP2: 1fdm / SCOPe / SUPFAM
- OPM superfamily: 67
- OPM protein: 1ifk
Available protein structures:
- PDB: IPR008020 PF05371 (ECOD; PDBsum)
- AlphaFold: IPR008020; PF05371

In molecular biology, a phage major coat protein is an alpha-helical protein that forms a viral envelope of filamentous bacteriophages. These bacteriophages are flexible rods, about one to two micrometres long and six nm in diameter, with a helical shell of protein subunits surrounding a DNA core. The approximately 50-residue subunit of the major coat protein is largely alpha-helix, and the axis of the alpha-helix makes a small angle with the axis of the virion. The protein shell can be considered in three sections: the outer surface, occupied by the N-terminal region of the subunit and rich in acidic residues that give the virion a low isoelectric point; the interior of the shell (including a 19-residue stretch of apolar side-chains) where protein subunits interact, mainly with each other; and the inner surface (occupied by the C-terminal region of the subunit), rich in positively charged residues that interact with the DNA core.
