= Angela Belcher =

American biochemist

Angela M. Belcher
- Citizenship: United States
- Education: University of California, Santa Barbara (B.S. 1991, Ph.D. 1997)
- Known for: Viral assembly of nanotechnology
- Awards: MacArthur Fellowship (2004); Beckman Young Investigators Award (2000); National Medal of Science (2024)
- Scientific career
- Fields: Biological engineering materials science
- Workplaces: MIT
- Thesis: Spatial and temporal resolution of interfaces, phase transitions and isolation of three families of proteins in calcium carbonate based biocomposite materials (1997)
- Doctoral advisor: Galen D. Stucky

Angela M. Belcher is a materials scientist, biological engineer, and the James Mason Crafts Professor of Biological Engineering and Materials Science at the Massachusetts Institute of Technology (MIT) in Cambridge, Massachusetts, United States. She is director of the Biomolecular Materials Group at MIT, a member of the Koch Institute for Integrative Cancer Research, and a 2004 MacArthur Fellow. In 2019, she was named head of the Department of Biological Engineering at MIT. She was elected a member of the National Academy of Sciences in 2022.

== Early life and education ==
Belcher grew up in San Antonio, Texas. She attended the University of California, Santa Barbara, where she received her bachelor's degree from the College of Creative Studies in 1991 and her Ph.D. in chemistry in 1997.

== Career ==
After studying abalone shells, she worked with several colleagues at MIT and engineered a virus, known as the M13 bacteriophage whose target is usually Escherichia coli. M13 can be made to latch onto and coat itself with inorganic materials including gold and cobalt oxide. The long tubular virus (coated in cobalt oxide) now acts as a minuscule length of wire called a nanowire. Belcher's group coaxed many of these nanowires together and found that they resemble the basic components of a potentially very powerful and compact battery. In 2002 she founded Cambrios with Evelyn L. Hu of (at the time) University of California, Santa Barbara. Their vision relied upon the use of nanostructured inorganic materials, fabricated and shaped by biological molecules to create novel materials and processes for a variety of industries. She also founded and serves on the Advisory Committee of Siluria Technologies, which develops catalytic methods for converting natural gas into products such as ethylene, gasoline, and diesel fuel.

In 2009 Belcher and her team demonstrated the feasibility of using genetically modified viruses to build both anode and cathode of a lithium-ion battery. These new batteries have the same energy capacity and power as cutting-edge rechargeable batteries earmarked for use in hybrid cars, as well as powering a range of electronic devices. The batteries could be manufactured using a cheap and environmentally friendly process, as the synthesis can be done near room temperature, using no harmful solvents or toxic materials. In October 2009, President Barack Obama visited Belcher's lab at MIT.

In 2014 Belcher and her group demonstrated the potential for M13 phages to detect cancer. They developed a nanoprobe that uses M13 virus-stabilized SWNTs (single walled carbon nanotubes) to visualize deep, disseminated tumors in vivo. Using this process, they were able to identify submillimeter tumors.

A Time article featured her work on viral batteries and Scientific American named her research leader of the year in 2006 for her current project. In 2002, she was named to the MIT Technology Review TR100 as one of the top 100 innovators in the world under the age of 35. In 2013, Belcher was awarded the Lemelson-MIT Prize.

She has been elected to the Academy of Arts & Sciences and the National Academy of Inventors. Belcher was also elected as a member of the National Academy of Engineering in 2018 for the development of novel genetic evolution methods for the generation of new materials and devices. In 2022, Belcher was appointed to the National Security Commission on Emerging Biotechnology.

In 2024, Belcher was awarded the National Medal of Science.
