= Phagemid =

DNA-based cloning vector

A phagemid or phasmid is a DNA-based cloning vector, which has both bacteriophage and plasmid properties. These vectors carry, in addition to the origin of plasmid replication, an origin of replication derived from bacteriophage. Unlike commonly used plasmids, phagemid vectors differ by having the ability to be packaged into the capsid of a bacteriophage, due to their having a genetic sequence that signals for packaging. Phagemids are used in a variety of biotechnology applications; for example, they can be used in a molecular biology technique called "phage display".

The term "phagemid" or "phagemids" was coined by a group of Soviet scientists, who discovered them, named them, and published the article in April 1984 in Gene magazine.

== Properties of the cloning vector ==
A phagemid (plasmid + phage) is a plasmid that contains an f1 origin of replication from an f1 phage. It can be used as a type of cloning vector in combination with filamentous phage M13. A phagemid can be replicated as a plasmid, and also be packaged as single stranded DNA in viral particles. Phagemids contain an origin of replication (ori) for double stranded replication, as well as an f1 ori to enable single stranded replication and packaging into phage particles. Many commonly used plasmids contain an f1 ori and are thus phagemids.

Similarly to a plasmid, a phagemid can be used to clone DNA fragments and be introduced into a bacterial host by a range of techniques, such as transformation and electroporation. However, infection of a bacterial host containing a phagemid with a 'helper' phage, for example VCSM13 or M13K07, provides the necessary viral components to enable single stranded DNA replication and packaging of the phagemid DNA into phage particles. The 'helper' phage infects the bacterial host by first attaching to the host cell's pilus and then, after attachment, transporting the phage genome into the cytoplasm of the host cell. Inside the cell, the phage genome triggers production of single stranded phagemid DNA in the cytoplasm. This phagemid DNA is then packaged into phage particles. The phage particles containing ssDNA are released from the bacterial host cell into the extracellular environment.

Filamentous phages retard bacterial growth but, contrasting with the lambda phage and the T7 phage, are not generally lytic. Helper phages are usually engineered to package less efficiently (via a defective phage origin of replication) than the phagemid so that the resultant phage particles contain predominantly phagemid DNA. F1 Filamentous phage infection requires the presence of a pilus so only bacterial hosts containing the F-plasmid or its derivatives can be used to generate phage particles.

Prior to the development of cycle sequencing, phagemids were used to generate single stranded DNA template for sequencing purposes. Today phagemids are still useful for generating templates for site-directed mutagenesis. Detailed characterisation of the filamentous phage life cycle and structural features lead to the development of phage display technology, in which a range of peptides and proteins can be expressed as fusions to phage coat proteins and displayed on the viral surface. The displayed peptides and polypeptides are associated with the corresponding coding DNA within the phage particle and so this technique lends itself to the study of protein-protein interactions and other ligand/receptor combinations.
