= Polyphage =

Type of virus

Polyphages are genomic multimers of bacteriophages in which multiple viral particles are all encapsulated, one after the other, within the same set of coat proteins. This phenomenon is characteristic of filamentous phages.
