= Bornum am Elm =

Coordinates: 52°15′33″N 10°45′12″E

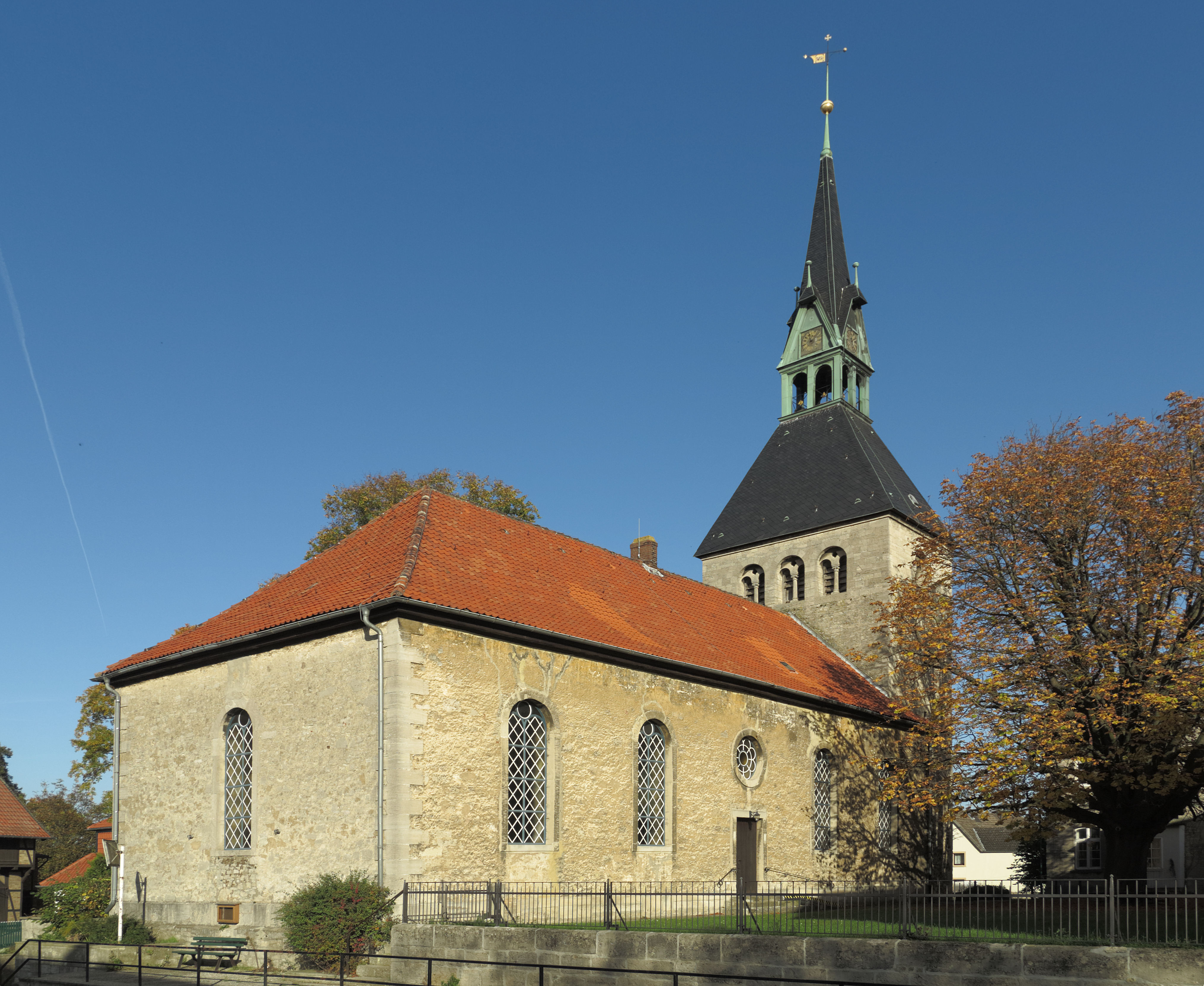
The Lutheran church

Bornum am Elm (German pronunciation: [ˈbɔʁnʊm ʔam ˈʔɛlm], lit. 'Bornum on the Elm') is a village of 919 inhabitants (2021) in the city of Königslutter am Elm, Lower Saxony, Germany. It was a municipality until 1974, when it was joined to Königslutter.

Bornum is near the northern edge of the Elm hills on the bank of the Scheppau stream, at an elevation of 135 meters. Neighboring places are Scheppau, Lauingen, and Abbenrode, as well as Königslutter proper. Industries include farming, tourism, and construction.

Archaeological evidence shows the existence of the village in the Iron Age. The oldest documentary mentioning dates from 1135, when properties in Bornum were given to the newly founded Königslutter Abbey by Lothair III, Holy Roman Emperor. The manor of the village was given as a fief to various holders by the dukes of Brunswick-Lüneburg. In 1390, it came to the von Weferlingen family; they sold it to the von Westphalen family in 1764. In 1779, it was bought back by Charles I, Duke of Brunswick-Lüneburg, who sold it to Amelungsborn Abbey in 1781. Up to the Napoleonic period, the Lord of the Manor had jurisdiction over the village. In 1844 the manor was bought by the farmers in the village and was dissolved.
