= Beienrode (Königslutter) =

- Ortsteil of Königslutter
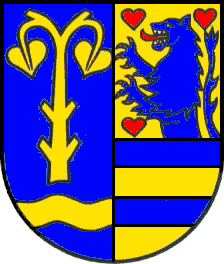
- Coat of arms
- Interactive map of Beienrode
- Location within Germany Location within Lower Saxony
- Coordinates: 52°18′9″N 10°51′16″E
- Country: Germany
- State: Lower Saxony
- District: Helmstedt
- Town: Königslutter
- Founded: 980
- Elevation: 130 m (430 ft)

Population (2021)
  - Total: 520
- Time zone: UTC+01:00 (CET)
  - Summer (DST): UTC+02:00 (CEST)
- Postal codes: 38154
- Dialling codes: 05353
- Vehicle registration: HE
- Website: www.beienrode.de

Beienrode (German pronunciation: [baɪənˈʁoːdə]) is a small village close to the mountain range Dorm in the Bundesland Lower Saxony, Germany. Beienrode is ca. 35 km eastward from Braunschweig. The village is directly up to the Bundesautobahn 2 (motorway) between Hannover and Berlin. The town of Beienrode accommodates about 545 residents and belongs to the city of Königslutter am Elm.

== Landscape ==
Beienrode is mainly marked by the river vallies of the Uhrau and Schunter. The small river Schunter flows, with a breadth of 6 m (19,6 ft), at the western border of the village. In the north hits the Schunter the beck of Uhrau. Further southwestern the river of Lutter open out into the Schunter close to the nature reserve Lutterlandbruch. The mountain range of Dorm, with the highest elevation of the Fuchsberg 182 m (597 ft), is in the southeastern bottom of Beienrode.

== History ==
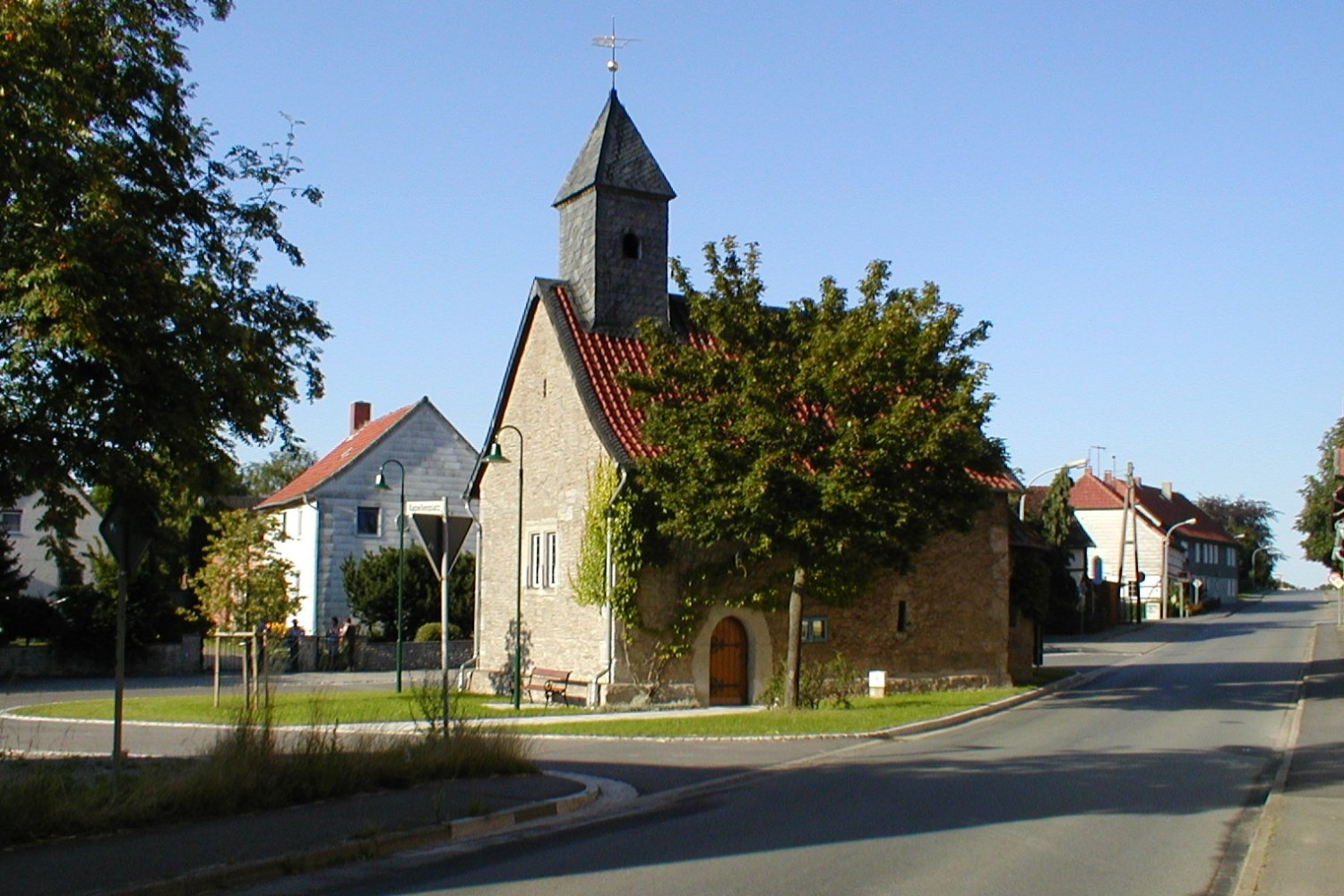
The 600-year-old chapel of Beienrode

The first mention of Beienrode was at September 10, 980 as Bodenrod. The German emperor Otto II donated the Saxonian Derlingau, with Beienrode, to his abider Mamecho.

The old part of Beienrode, the so-called Unterdorf, was in the river valley of the Schunter and originally a small farming village, surrounding the 1000-year-old manor. The Oberdorf was developed with the potash salt mine in the beginning of the 20th century. After World War I, the mine works were stopped.

Beienrode was a village close to the former inter-German border, 16 km (9.9 mi) off to the checkpoint Helmstedt-Marienborn. In fact of this distance, Beienrode was in the structurally weak place in the area adjacent to the Soviet Zone. Today Beienrode is a countrified village of commuters with round about 500 residents.

=== The potash salt winning ===
From 1900 until 1926 Beienrode had his biggest economic time with the potash salt mining. With the discovery of the artificial fertilizer in the end of the 19th century, potash salt became high status. Until the end of World War I, the German Empire was the only mining country for potash. In 1892 was the beginning of mining in Beienrode. The population of the small village increased up to 845 residents. By courtesy of worldwide discoveries of potash deposits, the German Empire lost their monopoly. In fact of that, the mine in Beienrode was closed. Until 1966 the mine was always ready for operation. After that time, all shaft towers were busted and the galleries were fled. Only the old water reservoir tower, the director's villa and the laboratory still exist.

== Facilities ==
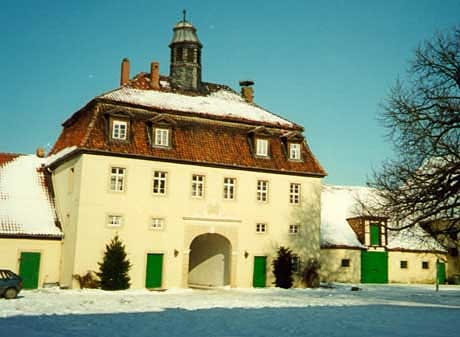
Entrance of the manor

Today in the manor is a diaconia care home Haus der helfenden Hände (House of helping hands) for old people with different diseases. This facility were founded in 1949 as an aid organization for evangelic refugees from East Prussia. After a radical sanitation of the façade and the interior, the manor's care home capacity were expanded to 80 people.

== Coat of arms ==
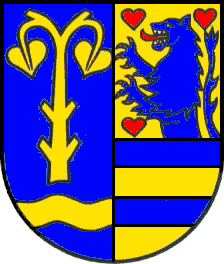
Coat of Arms

The upper right part of the crest shows the blue lion Lüneburg with red hearts on a golden base. The left part of the crest shows a garbled golden trunk of a tree with two sagging leaves of a lime floating above waves for the river Schunter. The garbled trunk is a modified coat of arms of the aristocratic family of von Veltheim. The crest was official introduced in 1969.
