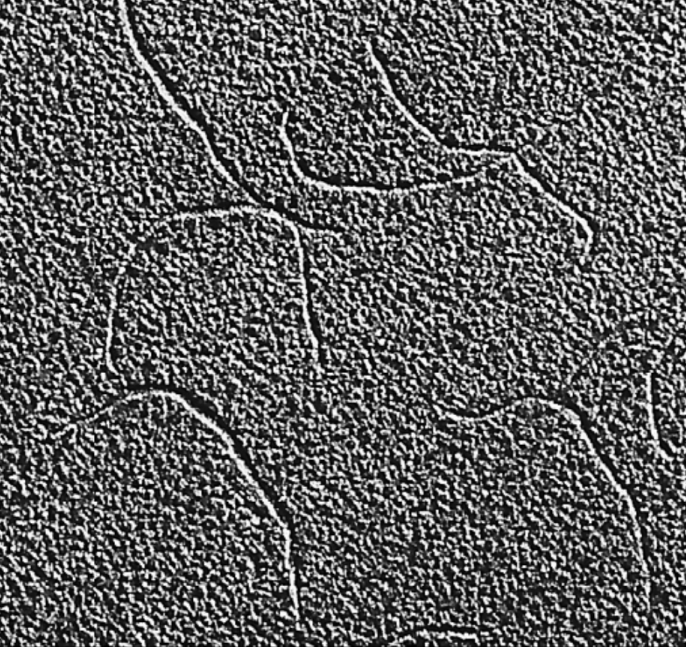
- Electron micrograph of shadowed filamentous bacteriophage (inovirus)

Virus classification
- (unranked): Virus
- Realm: Efunaviria
- Kingdom: Loebvirae
- Phylum: Hofneiviricota
- Class: Faserviricetes
- Order: Tubulavirales
- Family: Inoviridae

Genera
- See text

= Filamentous bacteriophage =

Inoviridae

Family of viruses

Filamentous bacteriophages are a family of viruses (Inoviridae) that infect bacteria, or bacteriophages. They are named for their filamentous shape, a worm-like chain (long, thin, and flexible, reminiscent of a length of cooked spaghetti), about 6 nm in diameter and about 1000-2000 nm long. This distinctive shape reflects their method of replication: the coat of the virion comprises five types of viral protein, which are located in the inner membrane of the host bacterium during phage assembly, and these proteins are added to the nascent virion's DNA as it is extruded through the membrane. The simplicity of filamentous phages makes them an appealing model organism for research in molecular biology, and they have also shown promise as tools in nanotechnology and immunology.

== Characteristics ==
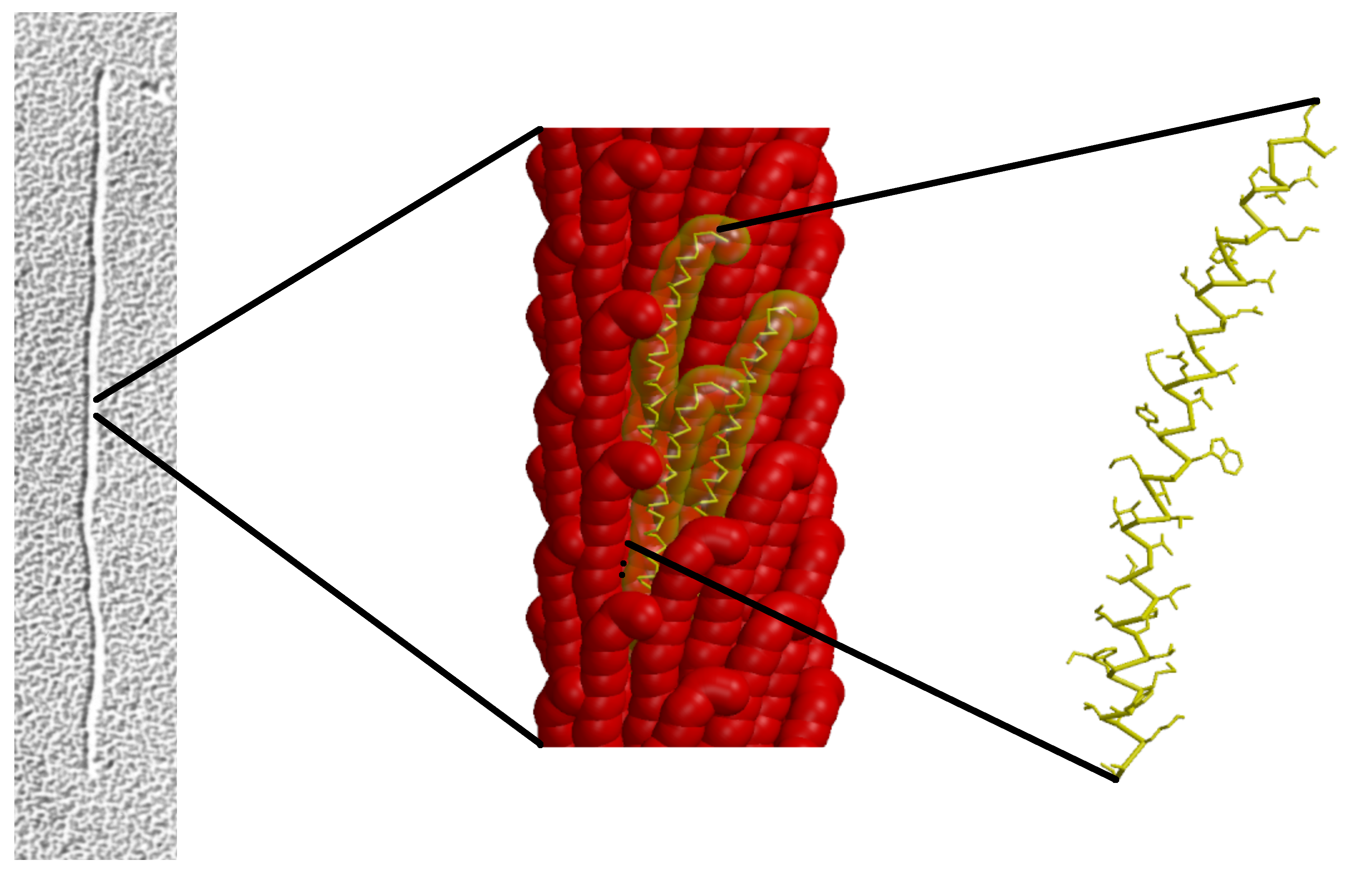
Assembled major coat protein subunits in Ff (fd, f1, M13) filamentous bacteriophage (genus Inovirus), exploded view.

Schematic views of a filamentous phage virion

Filamentous bacteriophages are among the simplest viruses known, with far fewer genes than the classical tailed bacteriophages studied by the phage group in the mid-20th century. The family contains 29 defined species, divided among 23 genera. However, mining of genomic and metagenomic datasets using a machine learning approach led to the discovery of 10,295 inovirus-like sequences in nearly all bacterial phyla across virtually every ecosystem, indicating that this group of viruses is much more diverse and widespread than originally appreciated.

Three filamentous bacteriophages, fd, f1, and M13, were isolated and characterized by three different research groups in the early 1960s, but they are so similar that they are sometimes grouped under the common name "Ff", which are members of the genus Inovirus, as acknowledged by the International Committee on Taxonomy of Viruses (ICTV). The molecular structure of Ff phages was determined using a number of physical techniques, especially X-ray fiber diffraction, solid-state NMR and cryo-electron microscopy. The structures of the phage capsid and of some other phage proteins are available from the Protein Data Bank. The single-stranded Ff phage DNA runs down the central core of the phage, and is protected by a cylindrical protein coat built from thousands of identical α-helical major coat protein subunits coded by phage gene 8. The gene 8 protein is inserted into the plasma membrane as an early step in phage assembly. Some strains of phage have a "leader sequence" on the gene 8 protein to promote membrane insertion, but others do not seem to need the leader sequence. The two ends of the phage are capped by a few copies of proteins that are important for infection of the host bacteria, and also for assembly of nascent phage particles. These proteins are the products of phage genes 3 and 6 at one end of the phage, and phage genes 7 and 9 at the other end. The fiber diffraction studies identified two structural classes of phage, differing in the details of the arrangement of the gene 8 protein. Class I has a rotation axis relating the gene 8 coat proteins, whereas for Class II this rotation axis is replaced by a helix axis. This technical difference has little noticeable effect on the overall phage structure, but the extent of independent diffraction data is greater for symmetry Class II than for Class I. This assisted the determination of the Class II phage Pf1 structure, and by extension the Class I structure.

Structural Class I includes strains fd, f1, M13 of genus Inovirus as well as If1 (of ICTV's species Infulavirus If1, genus Infulavirus) and IKe (of ICTV's species Lineavirus IKe, genus Lineavirus), whereas Class II includes strains Pf1 (of ICTV's species Primolicivirus Pf1 of genus Primolicivirus), and perhaps also Pf3 (of ICTV's species Tertilicivirus Pf3 of genus Tertilicivirus), Pf4 and PH75 (of NCBI's proposed species Thermus phage PH75, incertae sedis within Inoviridae).

The DNA isolated from fd phage (of genus Inovirus) is single-stranded, and topologically a circle. That is, the DNA single strand extends from one end of the phage particle to the other and then back again to close the circle, although the two strands are not base-paired. This topology was assumed to extend to all other filamentous phages, but it is not the case for phage Pf4, for which the DNA in the phage is single-stranded but topologically linear, not circular. During fd phage assembly, the phage DNA is first packaged into a linear intracellular nucleoprotein complex with many copies of the phage gene 5 replication/assembly protein. The gene 5 protein is then displaced by the gene 8 coat protein as the nascent phage is extruded across the bacterial plasma membrane without killing the bacterial host. This protein also binds with high affinity to G-quadruplex structures (although they are not present in the phage DNA) and to similar hairpin structures in phage DNA.

The p1 protein of Ff phage (i. e. genus Inovirus), which is required for phage assembly at the membrane, has a membrane-spanning hydrophobic domain with the N-terminal portion in the cytoplasm and the C-terminal portion in the periplasm (the reverse of the orientation of the gene 8 coat protein). Adjacent to the cytoplasmic side of the membrane-spanning domain is a 13- residue sequence of p1 having a pattern of basic residues closely matching the pattern of basic residues near the C terminus of p8, but inverted with respect to the sequence. This assembly mechanism makes this phage a valuable system with which to study transmembrane proteins. Gene 1, coding for an ATPase, is a conserved marker gene that (along with three additional genetic features) was used to automatically detect inovirus sequences.

=== Life cycle ===
Viral replication is cytoplasmic. Entry into the host cell is achieved by pilus-mediated adsorption into the host cell. Replication follows the ssDNA rolling circle model. DNA-templated transcription is the method of transcription. The virus exits the host cell by viral extrusion. Viral assembly occurs at the inner membrane (in case of Gram-negative bacteria), mediated by a membrane-embedded motor protein complex. This multimeric assembly complex, including p1 encoded by gene 1 (referred to as ZOT, zonula occludens toxin by researchers on Vibrio cholerae phage CTXΦ) is an ATPase containing functional and essential Walker motifs that are thought to mediate the hydrolysis of ATP providing the energy for the assembly of the phage filament. Filamentous phage Cf1t from Xanthomonas campestris (of NCBI's proposed species Xanthomonas phage Cf1t, incertae sedis within Inoviridae, likely misspelled as Cflt), was shown in 1987 to integrate into the host bacterial genome, and further such temperate filamentous phages have since been reported, many of which have been implicated in pathogenesis.

== Taxonomy ==
The following genera are recognized:

- Abaestuovirus
- Aclydivirus
- Acontivirus
- Actovirus
- Adiligaturavirus
- Affertcholeramvirus
- Amentovirus
- Anademivirus
- Antiavirus
- Aspidivirus
- Capistrivirus
- Catenatiovirus
- Circumitovirus
- Coriovirus
- Fasceasvirus
- Femenvirus
- Fibrovirus
- Galbavirus
- Habenivirus
- Infulavirus
- Inovirus
- Itinerivirus
- Lineavirus
- Lophivirus
- Meandervirus
- Nigolovirus
- Parhipatevirus
- Phargevirus
- Pilosavirus
- Plantarivirus
- Porrectionivirus
- Primolicivirus
- Prolivirus
- Propagovirus
- Psecadovirus
- Pubesvirus
- Pythonevirus
- Ramphavirus
- Restivirus
- Reticulivirus
- Saetivirus
- Sarmentivirus
- Scuticavirus
- Scytalavirus
- Semitavirus
- Senectutivirus
- Serpentivirus
- Siphunculivirus
- Staminivirus
- Strophivirus
- Subteminivirus
- Tertilicivirus
- Vasivirus
- Versovirus
- Vicialiavirus
- Villovirus
- Viscerivirus
- Vittavirus
- Xiphivirus
- Xylivirus

=== Notable members ===
- genus Inovirus aka Ff phages – these infect Escherichia coli carrying the F episome.

- species Inovirus M13

- M13 bacteriophage
- f1 phage

- species Filamentous bacteriophage fd (proposal)

- fd phage

- genus Affertcholeramvirus

- species Affertcholeramvirus CTXphi

- Vibrio phage CTXphi (aka CTXφ bacteriophage)

- genus Infulavirus)

- species Infulavirus If1

- If1 phage

- genus Lineavirus

- species Lineavirus IKe

- IKe phage

- genus Primolicivirus)

- species Primolicivirus Pf1

- Pf1 phage

- genus Tertilicivirus)

- species Tertilicivirus Pf3 — bacteriophages that infect Pseudomonas aeruginosa

- Pf3 phage

Further notable proposed species are:

- Thermus phage PH75

- PH75 phage

- Xanthomonas phage Cf1t (likely misspelled as Cflt)

- Cf1t phage

== History ==
The filamentous particle seen in electron micrographs was initially incorrectly interpreted as contaminating bacterial pilus, but ultrasonic degradation, which breaks flexible filaments roughly in half, inactivated infectivity as predicted for a filamentous bacteriophage morphology. Three filamentous bacteriophages, fd, f1 and M13, were isolated and characterized by three different research groups in the early 1960s. Since these three phages differ by less than 2 percent in their DNA sequences, corresponding to changes in only a few dozen codons in the whole genome, for many purposes they can be considered to be identical. Further independent characterization over the subsequent half-century was shaped by the interests of these research groups and their followers.

Filamentous phages, unlike most other phages, are continually extruded through the bacterial membrane without killing the host. Genetic studies on M13 using conditional lethal mutants, initiated by David Pratt and colleagues, led to description of phage gene functions. Notably, the protein product of gene 5, which is required for synthesis of progeny single-stranded DNA, is made in large amounts in the infected bacteria, and it binds to the nascent DNA to form a linear intracellular complex. (The simple numbering of genes using Arabic numerals 1,2,3,4... introduced by the Pratt group is sometimes displaced by the practice of using Roman numerals I, II, III, IV... but the gene numbers defined by the two systems are the same).

Longer (or shorter) DNA can be included in fd phage, since more (or fewer) protein subunits can be added during assembly as required to protect the DNA, making the phage convenient for genetic studies. The length of the phage is also affected by the positive charge per length on the inside surface of the phage capsid. The genome of fd was one of the first complete genomes to be sequenced.

The taxonomy of filamentous bacteriophage was defined by Andre Lwoff and Paul Tournier as family Inophagoviridae, genus I. inophagovirus, species Inophagovirus bacterii (Inos=fiber or filament in Greek), with phage fd (Hoffmann-Berling) as the type species. "Phagovirus" is tautological, and the name of the family was altered to Inoviridae and the type genus to Inovirus. This nomenclature persisted for many decades, although the definition of fd as type species was replaced as M13 became more widely used for genetic manipulation, and for studies of p8 in membrane mimetic environments. The number of known filamentous bacteriophages has multiplied many-fold by using a machine-learning approach, and it has been suggested that "the former Inoviridae family should be reclassified as an order, provisionally divided into 6 candidate families and 212 candidate subfamilies". Phages fd, f1, M13 and other related phages are Ff phages, for F specific (they infect Escherichia coli carrying the F-episome) filamentous phages, using the concept of vernacular name.

Filamentous bacteriophage engineered to display immunogenic peptides are useful in immunology and wider biological applications. George Smith and Greg Winter used f1 and fd for their work on phage display for which they were awarded a share of the 2018 Nobel Prize in Chemistry. The creation and exploitation of many derivatives of M13 for a wide range of purposes, especially in materials science, has been employed by Angela Belcher and colleagues. Filamentous bacteriophage can promote antibiotic tolerance by forming liquid crystalline domains around bacterial cells.
