= Phage display =

Biological technique to evolve proteins using bacteriophages

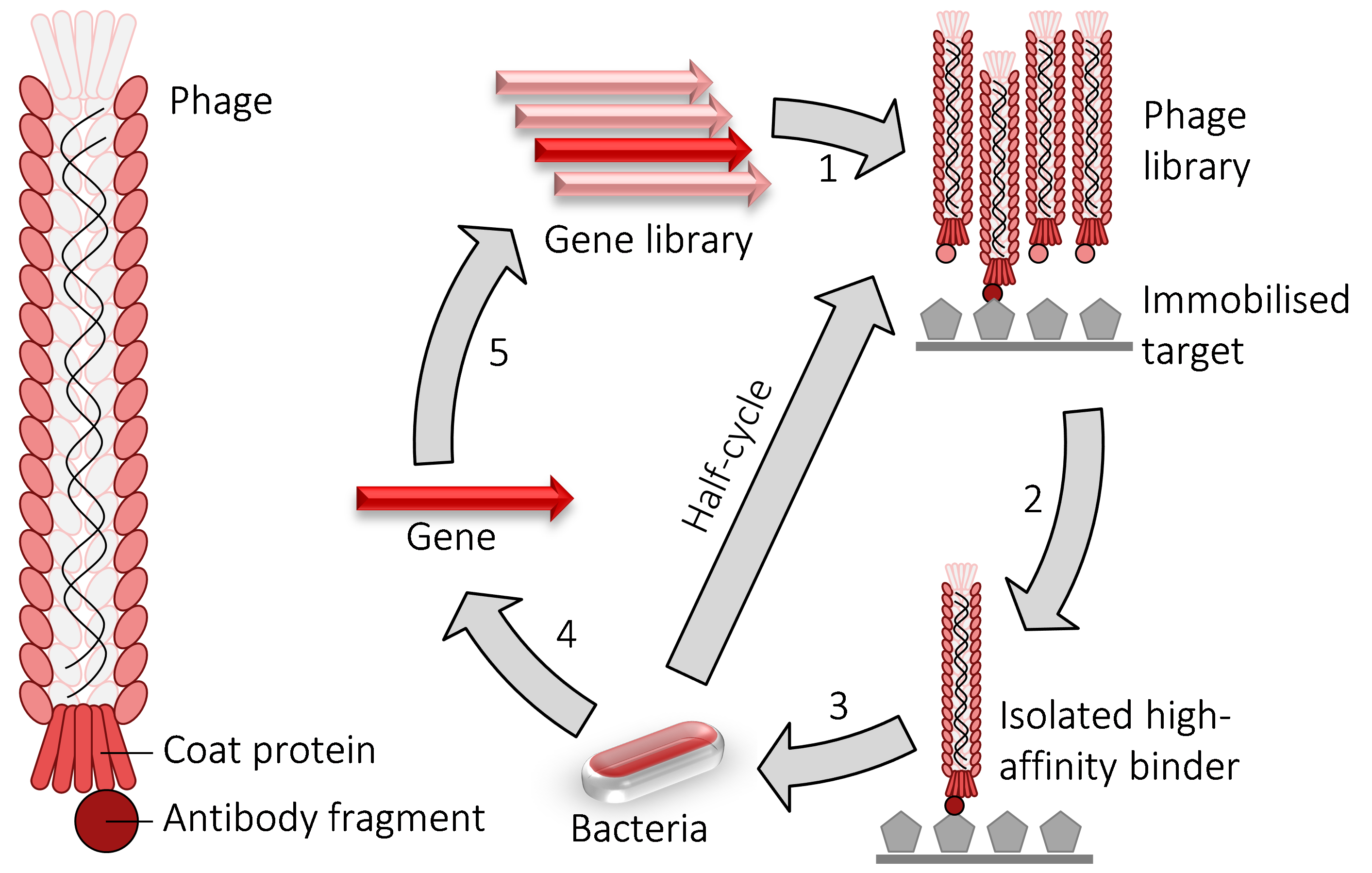
Phage display cycle: 1) Fusion proteins for a viral coat protein + the gene to be evolved (an antibody fragment in this case) are expressed in bacteriophage. 2) The library of phages are poured over an immobilised target. 3) Isolated high-affinity binders are used to infect bacteria. 4) The genes encoding the high-affinity binders are isolated. 5) Those genes may have random mutations introduced and used to perform another round of evolution. The selection and amplification steps can be performed multiple times at greater stringency to isolate higher-affinity binders.

Phage display is a laboratory technique for the study of protein interactions that uses bacteriophages (viruses that infect bacteria) to produce and "display" the proteins on their surfaces. Since the proteins remain attached to the surface of the phage, it is possible to isolate the phages displaying desirable proteins from among very large collections (libraries) of phages, using e.g. other protein or DNA molecules as baits. The DNA of the selected phages can then be sequenced to establish the identity of selected proteins. The phages themselves can be further propagated in bacteria to amplify or diversify the selected protein library, with potential for conducting directed evolution experiments with multiple rounds of selection and diversification.

Specifically, a gene encoding a protein of interest is inserted into a phage coat protein gene, causing the phage to "display" the protein on its outside while containing the gene for the protein on its inside. This couples the genotype (gene), phenotype (protein) in the context of an organism (phage) capable of replication. The phages displaying proteins of interest can then be selected using other proteins or DNA sequences in order to e.g., identify natural protein binding partners or antibodies with a high binding affinity.

The most common bacteriophages used in phage display are M13 and fd filamentous phage, though T4, T7, and λ phage have also been used.

== History ==
Phage display was first described by George P. Smith in 1985, when he demonstrated the display of peptides on filamentous phage (long, thin viruses that infect bacteria) by fusing the virus's capsid protein to one peptide out of a collection of peptide sequences. This displayed the different peptides on the outer surfaces of the collection of viral clones, where the screening step of the process isolated the peptides with the highest binding affinity.

In 1988, Stephen Parmley and George Smith described biopanning for affinity selection and demonstrated that recursive rounds of selection could enrich for clones present at 1 in a billion or less. In 1990, Jamie Scott and George Smith described creation of large random peptide libraries displayed on filamentous phage.

Phage display technology was further developed and improved by groups at the Laboratory of Molecular Biology with Greg Winter and John McCafferty, The Scripps Research Institute with Richard Lerner and Carlos Barbas and the German Cancer Research Center with Frank Breitling and Stefan Dübel for display of proteins such as antibodies for therapeutic protein engineering.

Smith and Winter were awarded a half share of the 2018 Nobel Prize in chemistry for their contribution to developing phage display. A patent by George Pieczenik claiming priority from 1985 also describes the generation of peptide libraries.

== Principle ==
In the case of M13 filamentous phage display, the DNA encoding the protein of interest is inserted into the gene encoding either the minor (pIII) or the major (pVIII) coat protein. The modified coat protein gene and the rest of the phage genome is then introduced into E. coli bacteria, which produce phage virions with the relevant protein fragment as part of their outer coat phage and the DNA encoding for these proteins packaged inside the phage.

The phages can then be selected using e.g. DNA or protein molecules immobilized on the surface of a microplate. Specifically, phages that display proteins that binds to those targets will remain attached, while others will be removed by washing. Those that remain can be eluted and amplified by bacterial infection. The repeated cycling of selection, elution and amplification is sometimes referred to as 'panning', in reference to the enrichment of a sample of gold by removing undesirable materials. Phage eluted in the final step can be sequenced to identify the selected proteins.

During amplification step, additional mutations may be introduced into the genes encoding the proteins of interest, enabling a directed evolution protocol.

Elution can be done combining low-pH elution buffer with sonification, which, in addition to loosening the peptide-target interaction, also serves to detach the target molecule from the immobilization surface. This ultrasound-based method enables single-step selection of a high-affinity peptide.

The DNA encoding a fusion of coat protein and protein of interest is often encoded on a phagemid - a plasmid containing both a bacterial origin of replication and phage attachment sequence. This allows it to be maintained and amplified in bacteria without producing phage virons. When bacterial colony reaches a desired size, a helper plasmid is transformed into the bacteria to supply them with the rest of the phage genome, enabling viron production. Alternatively, these phage genes can maintained within bacteria under inducible promoters, obviating the need for separate helper plasmid introduction.

== Applications ==
Applications of phage display technology include determination of interaction partners of a protein (which would be used as the immobilised phage "bait" with a DNA library consisting of all coding sequences of a cell, tissue or organism) so that the function or the mechanism of the function of that protein may be determined. Phage display is also a widely used method for in vitro protein evolution (also called protein engineering). As such, phage display is a useful tool in drug discovery. It is used for finding new ligands (enzyme inhibitors, receptor agonists and antagonists) to target proteins. The technique is also used to determine tumour antigens (for use in diagnosis and therapeutic targeting) and in searching for protein-DNA interactions using specially-constructed DNA libraries with randomised segments. Recently, phage display has also been used in the context of cancer treatments - such as the adoptive cell transfer approach. In these cases, phage display is used to create and select synthetic antibodies that target tumour surface proteins. These are made into synthetic receptors for T-Cells collected from the patient that are used to combat the disease. Recently, M13 bacteriophages were genetically engineered to display an anti-GD2 single-chain variable fragment (scFv) derived from the FDA-approved antibody Dinutuximab on their pIII coat protein. The engineered phages were subsequently loaded with hundreds of photosensitizer molecules to selectively deliver the payload to GD2-positive neuroblastoma cells. Upon activation by light (laser) or ultrasound, the photosensitizers induced targeted and precise killing of GD2-positive cells both in vitro and in vivo.

Competing methods for in vitro protein evolution include yeast display, bacterial display, ribosome display, and mRNA display.

=== Antibody maturation in vitro ===
The invention of antibody phage display revolutionised antibody drug discovery. Initial work was done by laboratories at the MRC Laboratory of Molecular Biology (Greg Winter and John McCafferty), the Scripps Research Institute (Richard Lerner and Carlos F. Barbas) and the German Cancer Research Centre (Frank Breitling and Stefan Dübel). In 1991, The Scripps group reported the first display and selection of human antibodies on phage. This initial study described the rapid isolation of human antibody Fab that bound tetanus toxin and the method was then extended to rapidly clone human anti-HIV-1 antibodies for vaccine design and therapy.

Phage display of antibody libraries has become a powerful method for both studying the immune response as well as a method to rapidly select and evolve human antibodies for therapy. Antibody phage display was later used by Carlos F. Barbas at The Scripps Research Institute to create synthetic human antibody libraries, a principle first patented in 1990 by Breitling and coworkers (Patent CA 2035384), thereby allowing human antibodies to be created in vitro from synthetic diversity elements.

Antibody libraries displaying millions of different antibodies on phage are often used in the pharmaceutical industry to isolate highly specific therapeutic antibody leads, for development into antibody drugs primarily as anti-cancer or anti-inflammatory therapeutics. One of the most successful was adalimumab, discovered by Cambridge Antibody Technology as D2E7 and developed and marketed by Abbott Laboratories. Adalimumab, an antibody to TNF alpha, was the world's first fully human antibody to achieve annual sales exceeding $1bn.

== General protocol ==
Below is the sequence of events that are followed in phage display screening to identify polypeptides that bind with high affinity to desired target protein or DNA sequence:

1. Target proteins or DNA sequences are immobilized to the wells of a microtiter plate.
2. Many genetic sequences are expressed in a bacteriophage library in the form of fusions with the bacteriophage coat protein, so that they are displayed on the surface of the viral particle. The protein displayed corresponds to the genetic sequence within the phage.
3. This phage-display library is added to the dish and after allowing the phage time to bind, the dish is washed.
4. Phage-displaying proteins that interact with the target molecules remain attached to the dish, while all others are washed away.
5. Attached phage may be eluted and used to create more phage by infection of suitable bacterial hosts. The new phage constitutes an enriched mixture, containing considerably less irrelevant phage (i.e. non-binding) than were present in the initial mixture.
6. Steps 3 to 5 are optionally repeated one or more times, further enriching the phage library in binding proteins.
7. Following further bacterial-based amplification, the DNA within the interacting phage is sequenced to identify the interacting proteins or protein fragments.

== Selection of the coat protein ==
=== Filamentous phages ===
==== pIII ====
pIII is the protein that determines the infectivity of the virion. pIII is composed of three domains (N1, N2 and CT) connected by glycine-rich linkers. The N2 domain binds to the F pilus during virion infection freeing the N1 domain which then interacts with a TolA protein on the surface of the bacterium. Insertions within this protein are usually added in position 249 (within a linker region between CT and N2), position 198 (within the N2 domain) and at the N-terminus (inserted between the N-terminal secretion sequence and the N-terminus of pIII). However, when using the BamHI site located at position 198 one must be careful of the unpaired Cysteine residue (C201) that could cause problems during phage display if one is using a non-truncated version of pIII.

An advantage of using pIII rather than pVIII is that pIII allows for monovalent display when using a phagemid (plasmid derived from Ff phages) combined with a helper phage. Moreover, pIII allows for the insertion of larger protein sequences (>100 amino acids) and is more tolerant to it than pVIII. However, using pIII as the fusion partner can lead to a decrease in phage infectivity leading to problems such as selection bias caused by difference in phage growth rate or even worse, the phage's inability to infect its host. Loss of phage infectivity can be avoided by using a phagemid plasmid and a helper phage so that the resultant phage contains both wild type and fusion pIII.

cDNA has also been analyzed using pIII via a two complementary leucine zippers system, Direct Interaction Rescue or by adding an 8-10 amino acid linker between the cDNA and pIII at the C-terminus.

==== pVIII ====
pVIII is the main coat protein of Ff phages. Peptides are usually fused to the N-terminus of pVIII. Usually peptides that can be fused to pVIII are 6-8 amino acids long. The size restriction seems to have less to do with structural impediment caused by the added section and more to do with the size exclusion caused by pIV during coat protein export. Since there are around 2700 copies of the protein on a typical phages, it is more likely that the protein of interest will be expressed polyvalently even if a phagemid is used. This makes the use of this protein unfavorable for the discovery of high affinity binding partners.

To overcome the size problem of pVIII, artificial coat proteins have been designed. An example is Weiss and Sidhu's inverted artificial coat protein (ACP) which allows the display of large proteins at the C-terminus. The ACP's could display a protein of 20kDa, however, only at low levels (mostly only monovalently).

==== pVI ====
pVI has been widely used for the display of cDNA libraries. The display of cDNA libraries via phage display is an attractive alternative to the yeast-2-hybrid method for the discovery of interacting proteins and peptides due to its high throughput capability. pVI has been used preferentially to pVIII and pIII for the expression of cDNA libraries because one can add the protein of interest to the C-terminus of pVI without greatly affecting pVI's role in phage assembly. This means that the stop codon in the cDNA is no longer an issue. However, phage display of cDNA is always limited by the inability of most prokaryotes in producing post-translational modifications present in eukaryotic cells or by the misfolding of multi-domain proteins.

While pVI has been useful for the analysis of cDNA libraries, pIII and pVIII remain the most utilized coat proteins for phage display.

==== pVII and pIX ====
In an experiment in 1995, display of Glutathione S-transferase was attempted on both pVII and pIX and failed. However, phage display of this protein was completed successfully after the addition of a periplasmic signal sequence (pelB or ompA) on the N-terminus. In a recent study, it has been shown that AviTag, FLAG and His could be displayed on pVII without the need of a signal sequence. Then the expression of single chain Fv's (scFv), and single chain T cell receptors (scTCR) were expressed both with and without the signal sequence.

PelB (an amino acid signal sequence that targets the protein to the periplasm where a signal peptidase then cleaves off PelB) improved the phage display level when compared to pVII and pIX fusions without the signal sequence. However, this led to the incorporation of more helper phage genomes rather than phagemid genomes. In all cases, phage display levels were lower than using pIII fusion. However, lower display might be more favorable for the selection of binders due to lower display being closer to true monovalent display. In five out of six occasions, pVII and pIX fusions without pelB was more efficient than pIII fusions in affinity selection assays. The paper even goes on to state that pVII and pIX display platforms may outperform pIII in the long run.

The use of pVII and pIX instead of pIII might also be an advantage because virion rescue may be undertaken without breaking the virion-antigen bond if the pIII used is wild type. Instead, one could cleave in a section between the bead and the antigen to elute. Since the pIII is intact it does not matter whether the antigen remains bound to the phage.

=== T7 phages ===
The issue of using Ff phages for phage display is that they require the protein of interest to be translocated across the bacterial inner membrane before they are assembled into the phage. Some proteins cannot undergo this process and therefore cannot be displayed on the surface of Ff phages. In these cases, T7 phage display is used instead. In T7 phage display, the protein to be displayed is attached to the C-terminus of the gene 10 capsid protein of T7.

The disadvantage of using T7 is that the size of the protein that can be expressed on the surface is limited to shorter peptides because large changes to the T7 genome cannot be accommodated like it is in M13 where the phage just makes its coat longer to fit the larger genome within it. However, it can be useful for the production of a large protein library for scFV selection where the scFV is expressed on an M13 phage and the antigens are expressed on the surface of the T7 phage.

== Bioinformatics resources and tools ==
Databases and computational tools for mimotopes have been an important part of phage display study. Databases, programs and web servers have been widely used to exclude target-unrelated peptides, characterize small molecules-protein interactions and map protein-protein interactions. Users can use three dimensional structure of a protein and the peptides selected from phage display experiment to map conformational epitopes. Some of the fast and efficient computational methods are available online.

== See also ==
- Directed evolution
- protein–protein interactions
- PelB leader sequence

Competing techniques:

- Two-hybrid system
- mRNA display
- Ribosome display
- Yeast display
