= Siluria Technologies =

Research company

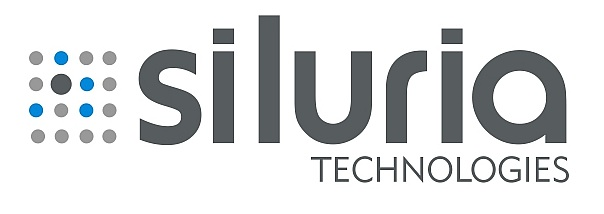

Siluria Technologies, Inc. was a San Francisco-based research company founded in 2007. It attempted to develop a commercial method to convert natural gas into ethylene, gasoline or diesel fuel using chemical catalysts. The company received over $100m from four rounds of start-up funding from venture capital firms and Saudi Aramco. A test run of the system produced gasoline in Hayward, California in August 2014.

McDermott, an engineering firm, purchased Siluria in 2019. McDermott emerged from bankruptcy and spun off its Lummus division including Siluria’s intellectual property and a demonstration plant in La Porte, Texas in 2020.
