= Alphabody =

Type of engineered protein

Alphabodies, also known as Cell-Penetrating Alphabodies or CPAB for short, are small 10 kDa proteins engineered to bind to a variety of antigens. Despite their name, they are not structurally similar to antibodies, which makes them a type of antibody mimetic. Alphabodies are different from many other antibody mimetics in their ability to reach and bind to intracellular protein targets. Their single chain alpha-helical structure is designed by computer modelling, inspired by naturally existing coiled-coil protein structures. Alphabodies are being developed by the Belgian biotechnology company Complix N.V. as potential new pharmaceutical drugs against cancer and autoimmune disease. In 2012, a collaboration agreement was signed with Monsanto to develop the technology for agricultural applications as well.

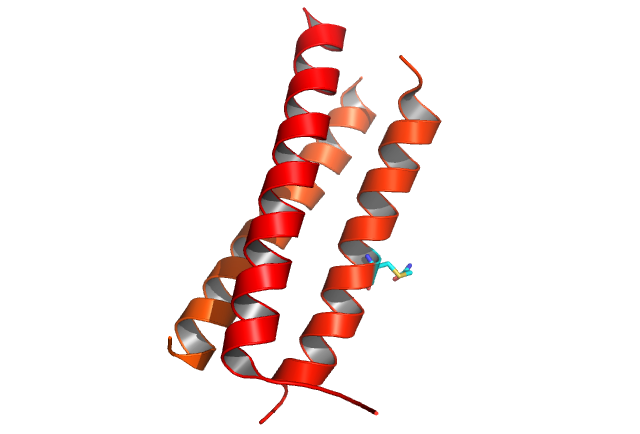
3D structure of the alphabody scaffold, showing a single chain, triple-helix coiled-coil fold. (PDB 4OG9)

== Development ==
Alphabodies are developed as scaffolds with a set of amino acid residues that can be modified to bind protein targets, while maintaining correct folding and thermostability.

The Alphabody scaffold is computationally designed based on coiled-coil structures, but it has no known counterpart in nature. Initially, the scaffold was made of three peptides that associated non-covalently to form a parallel coiled-coil trimer. However, the scaffold was later redesigned as a single peptide chain containing three α-helices connected by linker regions. The new structure allows for concentration-independent assembly and cost-effective scaling in bacterial expression systems.

The three α-helices (A, B, and C) were designed to remain stable even when some residues are modified. Residues in the groove between helices A and C can be modified to bind convex targets, while residues on the outside of helix C can be modified to bind concave protein targets. There are currently 3 libraries containing 1.0 to 1.7 × 10^{8} variations each that can be screened using phage display for target affinity.

== Structure ==
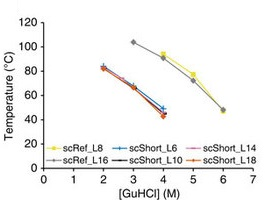
Alphabody denaturation data comparing truncated Alphabody stability to reference scaffold

=== Standard ===
The standard Alphabody scaffold contains three α-helices, composed of four heptad repeats (stretches of 7 residues) each, connected via glycine/serine-rich linkers. The standard heptad sequence is "IAAIQKQ". Alanines are associated with α-helix formation, while isoleucines are known to induce coiled-coil formation. Specific residues on the A and C helices can be modified to bind targets, but only variants that retain thermostability are used for further research.

Specifically, the reference scaffold structure is N–HRS1–L1–HRS2–L2–HRS3–C.

HRS = IEEIQKQIAAIQKQIAAIQKQIYRM; L = TGGSGGGSGGGSGGGSGMS

The linker length is long enough to allow helices to fold in parallel or anti-parallel conformations, but experiments suggest only anti-parallel folding occurs.

=== Truncated version ===
An Alphabody scaffold variant with shorter linkers can be produced without the loss of thermostability. However, decreasing the number of heptad repeats per α-helix reduces the thermostability of the Alphabody by around 40 °C.

== Properties ==
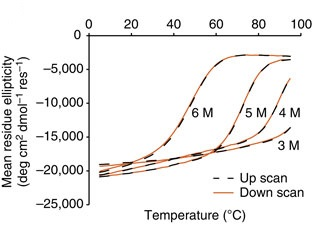
Alphabody denaturation data from circular dichroism experiments

Alphabodies have low molecular weight (~10 kDa) and very high thermostability (T_{m} = ~120 °C). Moreover, circular dichroism experiments suggest that Alphabodies can refold correctly after being denatured. These properties allow Alphabody-based drugs to be administered in ways other than injection. They also make the molecule stable enough to allow modification of residues on the scaffold itself – rather than only loop regions – increasing the possible variations and target selectivity.

Alphabodies' high binding affinity and ability to target both extracellular and intracellular proteins allows them to be used to reach difficult targets that cannot be treated by therapeutic antibodies or small molecule drugs.

== Targets ==
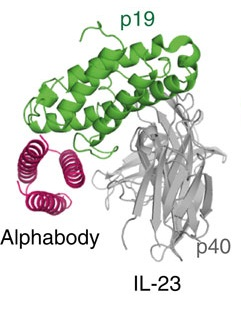
3D structure of Alphabody in complex with IL-23 p19 subunit

=== Autoimmune disease ===
Alphabody CMPX-1023 has been successfully developed to target the p19 subunit of Interleukin 23 (IL-23) and has entered preclinical trials as of October 2011. In brief, IL-23 is a pro-inflammatory cytokine that has been implicated in autoimmune inflammatory diseases like psoriasis, rheumatoid arthritis and Crohn's disease. There are anti-IL-23 drugs available, which work by targeting the p40 subunit. However, the p40 subunit is also present in Interleukin 12 (IL-12) and causes serious side-effects when antagonized, such as increased susceptibility to infection.

Complix N.V. used phage display to create Alphabodies that could bind IL-23, and then employed several affinity maturation strategies to increase affinity to sub-nanomolar levels. They determined increased affinity resulted in increased functional inhibition of IL-23 and thus selected top 20 strongest binding Alphabodies as drug candidates. Mouse studies and X-ray crystallography studies on IL-23 in complex with the Alphabody confirmed specific binding to p19 only.

=== Cancer ===
Using a similar drug development strategy, Complix N.V. is developing Alphabodies capable of binding intracellular targets in cancer cells that can induce apoptosis. According to a 2012 article, Complix has had a degree of success in doing so:

"These results show that Alphabodies can be designed to efficiently enter human cells and bind to targets of interest, allowing them to modulate intracellular protein-to-protein interactions and induce apoptosis in cancer cells. Complix expects to report further break-through data from this important program over the course of 2012."

== Funding ==
The research on IL-23-specific Alphabodies was supported by grants from IWT-O&O, Ghent University, and the Hercules foundation (Belgium).

Complix N.V. is funded by equity shareholders Baekeland Fund, Biotech Fund Flanders, CRP-Santé, Edmond de Rothschild Investment Partners, Gemma Frisius Fund, Gimv, LRM, OMNES Capital, TrustCapital, Vesalius Biocapital, and Vinnof.

== See also ==
- Affibody
- Affimer
- Affitin
- Anticalin
- DARPin
- Monobody
