= Antibody mimetic =

Antibody mimetics are organic compounds that, like antibodies, can specifically bind antigens, but that are not structurally related to antibodies. They are usually artificial peptides or proteins with a molar mass of about 3 to 20 kDa. (Antibodies are ~150 kDa.)

Nucleic acids and small molecules are sometimes considered antibody mimetics as well, but not artificial antibodies, antibody fragments and fusion proteins composed from these.

Common advantages over antibodies are better solubility, tissue penetration, stability towards heat and enzymes, and comparatively low production costs. Antibody mimetics are being developed as therapeutic and diagnostic agents.

== Examples ==
Antibody mimetic	Scaffold	Molar mass	Example drug
Affibody molecules	Z domain of Protein A	6 kDa	ABY-025
Affilins	Gamma-B crystallin	20 kDa	
Affilins	Ubiquitin	10 kDa	SPVF 2801
Affimers (Adhirons)	Cystatin	12–14 kDa	
Affitins	Sac7d (from Sulfolobus acidocaldarius)	7 kDa	
Alphabodies	Triple helix coiled coil	10 kDa	CMPX-1023
Anticalins	Lipocalins	20 kDa	
Avimers	A domains of various membrane receptors	9–18 kDa	
DARPins	Ankyrin repeat motif	10–19 kDa	MP0112
Fynomers	SH3 domain of Fyn	7 kDa	
Gastrobodies	Kunitz-type soybean trypsin inhibitor	20 kDa	
Kunitz domain peptides	Kunitz domains of various protease inhibitors	6 kDa	Ecallantide (Kalbitor)
Monobodies	10th type III domain of fibronectin	10 kDa	Pegdinetanib (Angiocept)
nanoCLAMPs	Carbohydrate Binding Module 32-2 (from Clostridium perfringens NagH)	16 kDa	
Optimers	Flexible nucleic acid based scaffold; G-quadruplex	8-15 kDa	
Repebodies	leucine-rich repeats		
Pronectin™	fourteenth fibronectin type-III scaffold of Human Fibronectin (14Fn3)	10 kDa	
Centyrins	highly stable fibronectin type III (FN3) domain	10 kDa	
Obodies	a high affinity binding protein domain engineered to bind to Hen Egg-white Lysozyme		

== See also ==
- Protein mimetic
- Optimer Ligand
