= Izokibep =

Protein therapeutic medication

Clinical data
- Trade names: Izokibep
- Other names: Izokibep
- Routes of administration: Subcutaneous
- ATC code: None

Identifiers
- CAS Number: 2226130-02-3
- DrugBank: DB19081
- UNII: 8B8VV1W6FZ
- KEGG: D12278

Izokibep is an investigational small protein therapeutic designed to selectively inhibit interleukin-17A (IL-17A), a pro-inflammatory cytokine implicated in various autoimmune and inflammatory diseases.

Developed initially by Affibody AB, a Swedish biotechnology company, izokibep has been evaluated for its potential in treating immune-mediated conditions such as psoriatic arthritis, hidradenitis suppurativa, uveitis, axial spondyloarthritis, and plaque psoriasis. Its small molecular size—approximately one-tenth that of a monoclonal antibody—enables high potency and enhanced tissue penetration, offering potential advantages over traditional antibody-based therapies.

== Structure ==
Izokibep is a small, 18.6 kDa fusion protein designed as a dimeric ligand trap, comprising two interleukin-17A (IL-17A)-specific Affibody domains flanking a central albumin-binding domain (ABD). All three domains are smaller engineered derivatives of the 58-residue immunoglobulin (Ig)-binding Z-domain from Staphylococcal Protein A (SPA), with each Affibody domain forming a triple-helical structure that confers femtomolar affinity for IL-17A (K_{D} = 0.32 pM). The ABD, also based on a modified Z-domain scaffold, binds human serum albumin with high affinity (K_{D} = 49 pM), thereby extending systemic circulation and enabling subcutaneous administration every two weeks. With a chemical formula of C_{824}H_{1292}N_{216}O_{276}, izokibep's compact size—approximately one-eighth that of a monoclonal antibody—enhances tissue penetration while maintaining serum stability for at least eight weeks at 37 °C. The dimeric configuration increases inhibitory potency relative to monomeric forms and has demonstrated superior IL-17A blockade compared to monoclonal antibodies such as secukinumab in preclinical studies.

== Pharmacology ==
=== Pharmacokinetics ===
Izokibep's pharmacokinetics are influenced by its small molecular size (18.6 kDa) and albumin-binding domain (ABD), which contribute to a long half-life and favorable tissue distribution, particularly to inflammatory sites. The ABD enables sustained systemic exposure, allowing subcutaneous administration every 2 weeks while maintaining therapeutic efficacy. Preclinical stability studies demonstrated izokibep remains stable in human serum at 37°C for ≥8 weeks and retains IL-17A binding capacity under various storage conditions. Phase 1 trials showed rapid efficacy in psoriasis patients after single intravenous or subcutaneous doses, with pharmacokinetic profiles supporting further development of subcutaneous dosing regimens.

=== Mechanism of action ===
Izokibep is a fusion protein that combines an IL-17A binding domain with albumin-binding technology to extend its half-life in the body. By selectively binding to IL-17A, izokibep prevents the cytokine from interacting with its receptor, thereby reducing inflammation and tissue damage associated with IL-17-driven diseases. Its small size, approximately 18.6 kDa, allows for high drug exposure via subcutaneous injection, potentially improving efficacy in tissues with limited accessibility to larger molecules like monoclonal antibodies. Preclinical studies have shown that izokibep inhibits IL-17A with 10 to 100 times greater potency than leading IL-17-inhibiting antibody drugs.

== Administration ==
Izokibep is administered via subcutaneous injection, with dosing regimens in trials ranging from weekly to every two weeks, typically at doses of 2 mg to 160 mg. Its small molecular size allows for high drug concentrations in inflamed tissues, potentially enhancing efficacy compared to larger biologics.

== Adverse effects ==
The most common adverse effects reported in clinical trials are injection site reactions, nasopharyngitis, and headaches.

== Development history ==
Izokibep was originally developed by Affibody AB, leveraging its proprietary Affibody® technology to create a novel IL-17A inhibitor.

In 2021, Acelyrin, Inc., a California-based biopharmaceutical company, licensed global development and commercialization rights for izokibep (excluding certain Asian markets) for an upfront payment of $25 million, with potential milestone payments up to $280 million. Inmagene Biopharmaceuticals also held rights for development in select Asian markets, including China and South Korea.

In August 2024, Acelyrin began scaling back its izokibep programs, discontinuing development for psoriatic arthritis and hidradenitis suppurativa despite earlier positive results. This decision followed a Phase 2b/3 trial in uveitis that failed to meet its primary and secondary endpoints in late 2024. By February 2025, Acelyrin terminated its licensing agreement, returning full rights to Affibody. Concurrently, Inmagene Biopharmaceuticals ended its agreement covering Asian markets, leaving Affibody as the sole developer.

== Clinical trials ==
=== Psoriatic arthritis ===
The Phase 2b/3 trial, involving 351 patients, demonstrated significant improvements in joint and skin symptoms, with 40% and 43% of patients on weekly or biweekly 160 mg doses achieving ACR50 at 16 weeks, compared to 15% on placebo. The trial also met secondary endpoints, including ACR70 and PASI100, and showed a favorable safety profile. A previous Phase 2 trial with 135 patients reported higher efficacy than standard treatments, with continued improvements through 46 weeks. Despite these results, Acelyrin discontinued development in August 2024, but Affibody plans a confirmatory Phase 3 trial.

=== Hidradenitis suppurativa ===
A Phase 3 trial with approximately 250 patients was designed to evaluate HiSCR75 at 16 weeks, with topline data reported in the second half of 2024. An earlier Phase 2b trial showed that one-third of patients in the open-label Part A achieved complete symptom reduction at 12 weeks. Part B did not meet its primary endpoint due to an unexpected placebo response, but post-hoc analyses indicated significant efficacy. A 32-week open-label extension confirmed further improvements and safety. Acelyrin halted development in 2024.

=== Uveitis ===
A Phase 2b/3 trial for non-infectious uveitis failed to meet its primary and secondary endpoints in late 2024, prompting Acelyrin to reduce investment in this indication.

=== Axial spondyloarthritis ===
A Phase 3 program is planned to evaluate izokibep's efficacy in reducing spinal inflammation and pain, building on earlier preclinical and clinical data.

=== Psoriasis ===
A Phase 2 trial with 108 patients demonstrated dose-dependent efficacy, with PASI 90 response rates at week 12 ranging from 0% for placebo to 71% for the 80 mg dose. The drug was well-tolerated, with mild injection site reactions as the primary adverse event. Efficacy was maintained at higher doses for up to three years, with no new safety signals. Results were published in the British Journal of Dermatology in September 2023.

== Current status ==
As of early 2025, Affibody AB has regained full rights to izokibep following the termination of licensing agreements with Acelyrin and Inmagene.

Affibody is continuing development, with ongoing and planned trials in psoriatic arthritis, hidradenitis suppurativa, uveitis, and axial spondyloarthritis. The company is also exploring new indications and seeking partnerships to advance the drug.
