= C2orf80 =

Gene

Identifiers
- Aliases: C2orf80, GONDA1, chromosome 2 open reading frame 80
- External IDs: OMIM: 615536; MGI: 2138198; HomoloGene: 129674; GeneCards: C2orf80; OMA:C2orf80 - orthologs

Gene location (Human)
Chr.	Chromosome 2 (human)
Band	2q33.3	Start	208,165,343 bp
Band	2q33.3	End	208,190,030 bp

Gene location (Mouse)
Chr.	Chromosome 1 (mouse)
Band	1|1 C2	Start	65,105,285 bp
Band	1|1 C2	End	65,123,214 bp
RNA expression pattern
Bgee	Human / Mouse (ortholog); Top expressed in: endothelial cell; middle temporal gyrus; dorsolateral prefrontal cortex; prefrontal cortex; anterior cingulate cortex; Brodmann area 23; Brodmann area 9; amygdala; nucleus accumbens; right frontal lobe / Top expressed in: right kidney; otolith organ; utricle; gastrula; lumbar subsegment of spinal cord; human kidney; zygote; secondary oocyte; granulocyte; dentate gyrus of hippocampal formation granule cell; More reference expression data
BioGPS	n/a
Orthologs
Species	Human	Mouse
Entrez	389073	98303
Ensembl	ENSG00000188674	ENSMUSG00000044816
UniProt	Q0P641	Q8C3M9
RefSeq (mRNA)	NM_001099334	NM_001285881; NM_001285882; NM_175293
RefSeq (protein)	NP_001092804	NP_001272810; NP_001272811; NP_780502
Location (UCSC)	Chr 2: 208.17 – 208.19 Mb	Chr 1: 65.11 – 65.12 Mb
PubMed search
- Wikidata
View/Edit Human	View/Edit Mouse

C2orf80 (chromosome 2 open reading frame 80) is a protein that, in humans, is encoded by the c2orf80 gene. The gene c2orf80 also goes by the alias GONDA1 (gonad development associated 1). In humans, c2orf80 is exclusively expressed in the brain. While relatively little is known about the function of c2orf80, medical studies have shown a strong association between variations in c2orf80 and IDH-mutant gliomas, 46,XY gonadal dysgenesis, and a possible association with blood pressure.

== Gene ==
The c2orf80 gene is located on the negative sense strand of chromosome 2 at locus 2q33.3, and has nine exons. It spans from 208165347-2081902581. There are six isoforms of c2orf80.

Location of c2orf80 on chromosome 2 at locus 2q33.3

Chromosome 2

Isoforms of c2orf80 in Humans
Isoform	Accession number	Base Pairs	Amino Acids
X1	NM_001099334.3	1195	193
X2	XM_017004075.1	1098	200
X3	XM_017004076.1	1183	193
X4	XM_017004077.1	1043	183
X5	XM_024452880.1	1118	176
X6	XM_017004078.1	578	131

=== Neighbors ===
The loci near c2orf80 are protein encoding, and include genes IDH1 (histone deacetylase inhibitor 1), and CRYGB (crystallin gamma B).

The IDH1 protein is the NADP(+)-dependent isocitrate dehydrogenase found in the cytoplasm and peroxisomes. It is involved in catalyzing the oxidative decarboxylation of isocitrate to 2-oxoglutarate. Mutations in IDH have been associated strongly with gliomas, and it is a strong candidate for therapeutic targeting.

The gene CRYGB, or crystallin gamma B, encodes a protein found in the lens and cornea of the eye, and have been involved in cataract formation.

=== Gene expression ===
Within the cell, it is possible that c2orf80 is expressed in the nucleus, or the mitochondria. An analysis via PSORT II concluded that there is a 47.8% probability that c2orf80 is located in the nucleus, and a 39.1% probability it is located in the mitochondria. The c2orf80 protein has two nuclear localization signals that may play a role in directing the protein to the nucleus of the cell.

C2orf80 is tissue specific, and expressed only in the brain. A tumor specific RNA assessment via The Cancer Genome Atlas showed significant expression of c2orf80 in gliomas. This reveals that c2orf80 is likely not functioning in neurons because gliomas are not present in neurons. Gene Paint explored expression of c2orf80 in infant mice, revealing concentrated expression in the frontal lobe.

=== Regulation of expression ===
There are many transcription factors involved in the regulation of expression of c2orf80. Due to the tissue specific expression, only transcription factors with brain tissue specificity increase c2orf80 transcription. The promoter of c2orf80 X1 is GXP_9792289.

Select c2orf80 Transcription Factors with Brain Tissue Expression
Transcription factor	Function
NKX Homeodomain transcription factor	Plays a role in organ development
CLOX and CLOX homology (CDP) factor	Plays a role in nervous system growth
Paralog hox genes 1-8 from the four hox clusters A, B, C, D	Play a role in central nervous system development
SOX/SRY-sex/testis determining and related HMG box factor	Plays a role in sex determination

== Protein ==
The protein product of c2orf80 is 193 amino acids in length with a predicted molecular weight of 22kDa and an isoelectric point of 9.5.

=== Post-translational modifications ===
Several different post-translation factors regulate the expression of the c2orf80 gene. There is a large disordered region spanning from amino acid 155-193 that is a possible site for phosphorylation from many kinases. The phosphorylations with the highest confidence scores are all modified by the same kinases, AGC, PKC, PKCh, and PRKCE which are involved in cell growth and death, and protein function modification. Other post-transcriptional modifications posited by EML are shown below.

Affinity chromatography verified interaction between Protein Kinase D2 (PRKD2) and c2orf80. The protein PRKD2 can bind to diacylglycerol (DAG) in the trans-Golgi network (TGN), and can be activated by phorbol esters as well as by gastrin via the cholecystokinin B receptor (CCKBR) in gastric cancer cells.

The protein ZNF804A (zinc finger protein 804A) has been shown by the first genome-wide significant association with the broad phenotype of psychosis to be associated with schizophrenia and bipolar disorder. When ZNF804A was knocked out, c2orf80 expression was downregulated, indicating a regulatory relationship between the two.

Select Post-Translational Modification Motifs of c2orf80
Motif	Function
MAPK	MAPK cascades are central signaling pathways that regulate a wide variety of stimulated cellular processes. Deregulation can lead to cancer.
SUMO-1	Causes dramatic rearrangements of subcellular location. Three possible functions of sumoylation: (i) protein targeting, (ii) enhanced protein stability, (iii) transcriptional control
PP2B	A Ca2+- and calmodulin-regulated serine/threonine protein that regulates Ca2+-dependent migration of neutrophils, synaptic plasticity, and apoptosis
Canonical Arg-Containing Phosphorylation	14-3-3 proteins are involved in cellular processes such as signal transduction, cell-cycle control, apoptosis, stress response and malignant transformation. 14-3-3 proteins possess no catalytic activity so they perform functional tasks only binding and modulating the activity of their partner proteins

=== Structure ===
The secondary structure is predicted to consist mostly of alpha helices. The predicted 3D structure via Alphafold is shown. Various alpha helices and a disordered region can be seen.

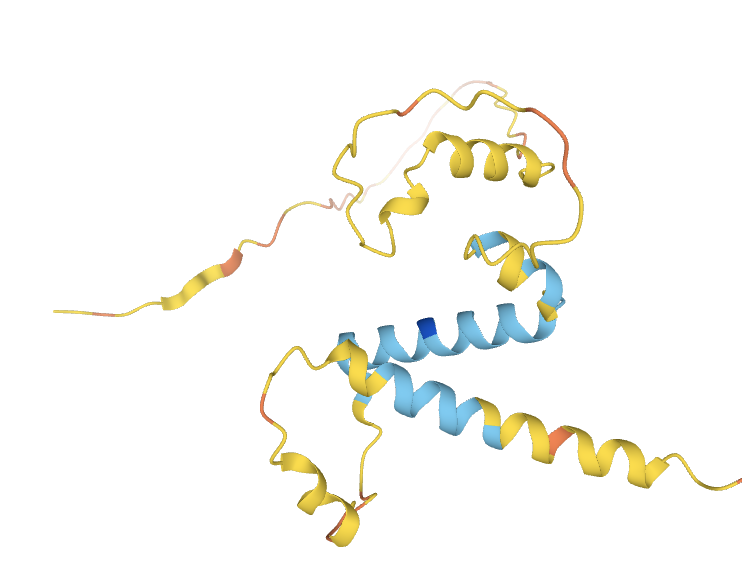
3D structure of c2orf80

=== Function ===
The function of the c2orf80 protein is unknown. There are indications that it could be involved in sex determination, or cell division regulation.

== Homology ==
C2orf80 is found in all vertebrates and was first seen 465 million years ago in sharks. There are no observed paralogs for c2orf80 within the human genome.

=== Orthologs ===
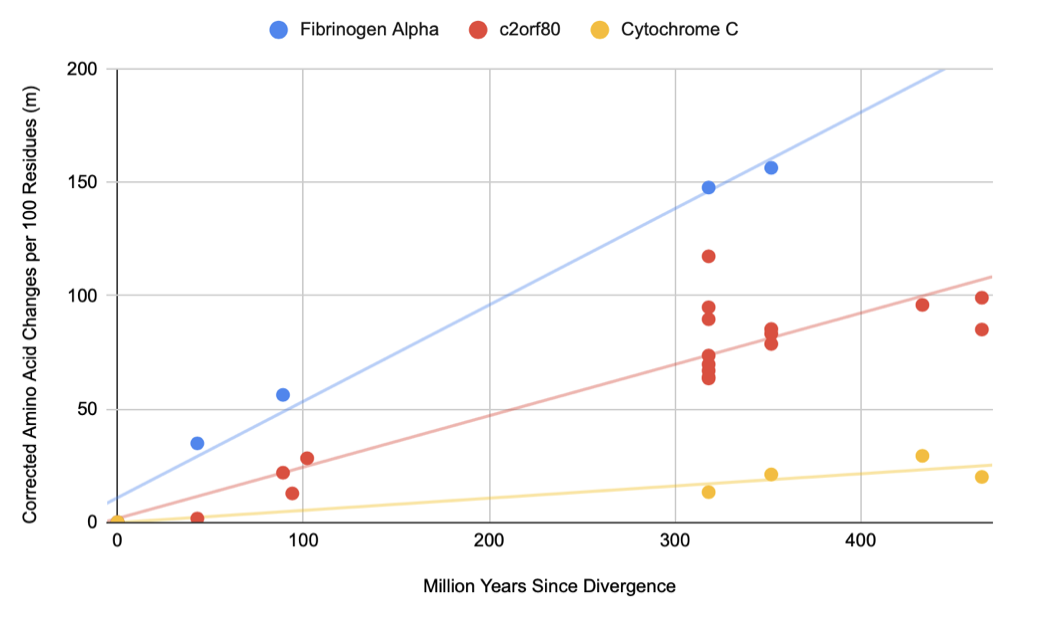
Corrected Amino Acid Changes per 100 Residues vs Million Years Since Divergence for Fibrinogen Alpha, c2orf80, and Cytochrome C

The similarity to the human sequence generally decreases as the divergence date from humans increases, but there are some fluctuations in this trend possibly due to a functionally unimportant, poorly conserved region.

Orthologs of c2orf80
Genus, Species	Common name	Accession number	Sequence length (amino acids)	Sequence identity to Human c2orf80 (%)	Median Divergence Date (Million Years Ago)
Homo sapiens	Human	NP_001092804.2	193	100	0
Ictidomys tridecemlineatus	Thirteen lined ground squirrel	XP_040150742.1	210	71	89
Mus musculus	Mouse	NP_001272811.1	196	62.9	89
Orycteropus afer afer	Aardvark	XP_007934115.1	207	75.4	102
Anolis carolinesis	Anole lizard	XP_003220055.1	178	53	318
Chelonia mydas	Green se turtle	XP_037769043.1	218	52.7	318
Egretta garzetta	little egret	XP_009635806.1	198	51.2	318
Alligator sinensis	alligator	XP_006029205.1	233	49.8	318
Nothoprocta perdicaria	Chilean tinamou	XP_025904208.1	215	47.9	318
Aptenodytes forsteri	Emperor penguin	XP_009287939.1	142	40.8	318
Bufo bufo	Common toad	XP_040297412.1	188	45.5	351.7
Xenopus tropicalis	Western clawed frog	XP_017953126.2	210	43.5	351.7
Rhinatrema bivittatum	Two-lined caecilian	XP_029462232.1	235	43.6	351.7
Carcharodon carcharias	Great white shark	XP_041056463.1	204	42.7	465
Oreochromis aureus	Blue tilapia	XP_039455604.1	210	38.3	433
Rhincodon typus	Whale shark	XP_020371397.1	213	37.1	465
Astyanax mexicanus	Mexican tetra	XP_022536111.1	201	36.4	433

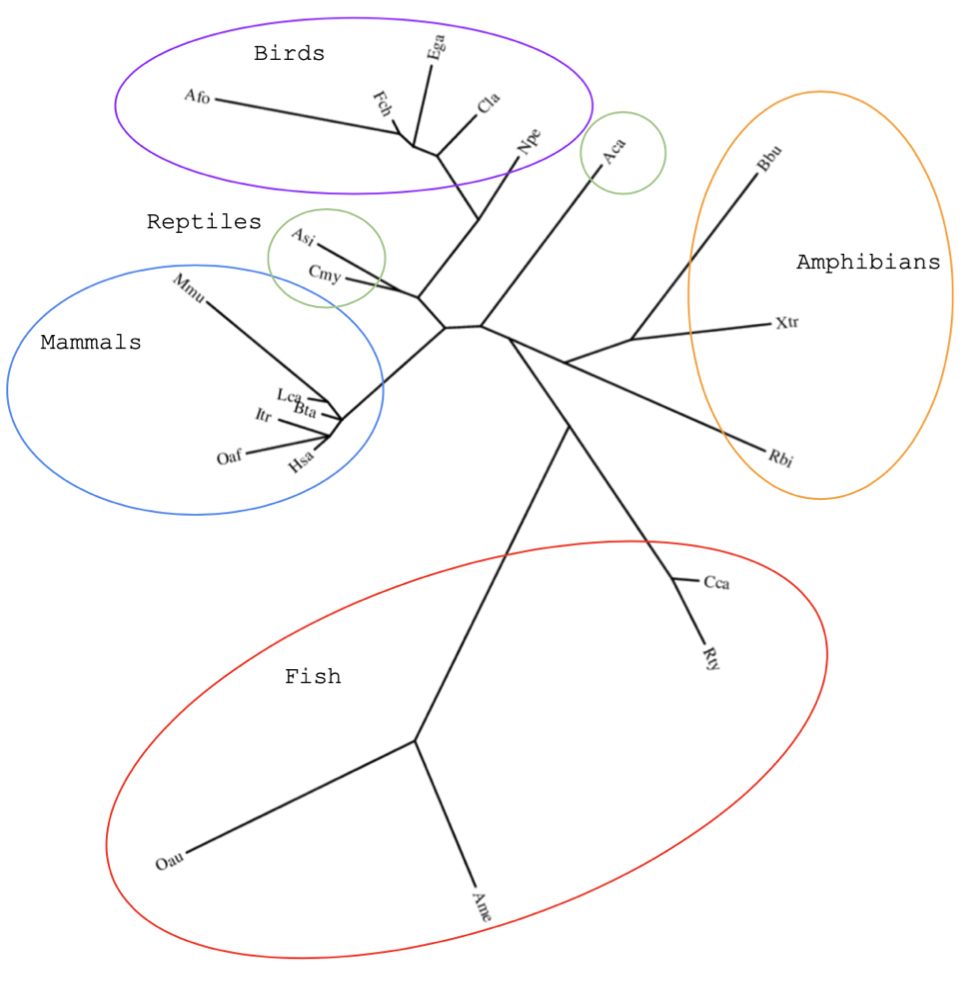
Unrooted phylogenetic tree showing the evolution of c2orf80. Constricted via Phylogeny.fr. Mammals: Hsu (human), Mmu (mouse), Lca (River Otter), Oaf (Aardvark), Itr (Thirteen lined ground squirrel), Bta (cow) Birds: Ega (little egret), Afo (emperor penguin), Npe (chilean tinamou), Cla (lance tailed manakin), Fch (saker falcon) Reptiles: Aca (anole lizard), Cmy (green sea turtle), Asi (alligator) Amphibians: Rbi (two-lined caecilian), Bbu (common toad), Xtr (western clawed frog) Fish: Oau (blue tilapia), Ame (mexican tetra), Rty (whale shark), Cca (great white shark)

== Clinical significance ==
Published research studies that mention c2orf80 indicate it could be involved in a number of maladies. Variants in c2orf80 are associated with IDH-mutant gliomas, possibly due to the proximity of c2orf80 to IDH1 on chromosome 2.

Siblings with 46X,Y gonadal dysgenesis, a disorder of sex development, had a deletion of 8 of the 9 c2orf80 exons, and an interstitial duplication of the SUPT3H gene. Both mutations were inherited from the healthy mother. There is no known interaction between these two genes as of now.
