= Cystatin =

Group of endogenous cysteine proteinase inhibitors

Proteinase inhibitor I25, cystatin
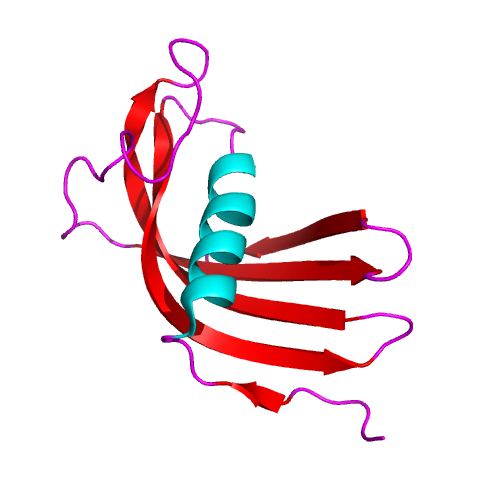
- Crystal structure of an immunomodulatory salivary cystatin from the soft tick Ornithodoros moubata from PDB entry 3L0R.

Identifiers
- Symbol: Prot_inh_cystat
- Pfam: PF00031
- Pfam clan: CL0121
- InterPro: IPR000010
- SMART: SM00043
- PROSITE: PDOC00259
Available protein structures:
- PDB: PDB: 1a67 PDB: 1a90 PDB: 1cew PDB: 1cyu PDB: 1cyv PDB: 1dvc PDB: 1dvd PDB: 1eqk PDB: 1g96 PDB: 1gd3 IPR000010 PF00031 (ECOD; PDBsum)
- AlphaFold: IPR000010; PF00031

The cystatins are a family of cysteine protease inhibitors which share a sequence homology and a common tertiary structure of an alpha helix lying on top of an anti-parallel beta sheet. The family is subdivided as described below.

Cystatins show similarity to fetuins, kininogens, histidine-rich glycoproteins and cystatin-related proteins. Cystatins mainly inhibit peptidase enzymes (another term for proteases) belonging to peptidase families C1 (papain family) and C13 (legumain family). They are known to mis-fold to form amyloid deposits and are implicated in several diseases.

== Types ==
The cystatin family includes:

- The Type 1 cystatins, which are intracellular and are present in the cytosol of many cell types, but can also appear in body fluids at significant concentrations. They are single-chain polypeptides of about 100 residues, which have neither disulfide bonds nor carbohydrate side-chains. Type 1 cystatins are also known as Stefins (after the Stefan Institute where they were first discovered)
- The Type 2 cystatins, which are mainly extracellular secreted polypeptides are largely acidic, contain four conserved cysteine residues known to form two disulfide bonds, may be glycosylated and/or phosphorylated. They are synthesised with a 19- to 28-residue signal peptide. They are broadly distributed and found in most body fluids.
- The Type 3 cystatins, which are multidomain proteins. The mammalian representatives of this group are the kininogens. There are three different kininogens in mammals: H- (high-molecular-mass, InterPro: IPR002395) and L- (low-molecular-mass) kininogen, which are found in a number of species, and T-kininogen, which is found only in rats.
- Unclassified cystatins. These are cystatin-like proteins found in a range of organisms: plant phytocystatins, fetuin in mammals, insect cystatins, and a puff adder venom cystatin, which inhibits metalloproteases of the MEROPS peptidase family M12 (astacin/adamalysin). Also, a number of the cystatin-like proteins have been shown to be devoid of inhibitory activity.

=== Human cystatins ===
- CST1, CST2, CST3 (cystatin C, a marker of kidney function), CST4, CST5, CST6, CST7, CST8, CST9, CST11, CSTA (cystatin A), CSTB (cystatin B)

=== Plant cystatins ===
Plant cystatins have special characteristics which permit them to be classified in a special class called Phytocystatin. One is the presence of a N-terminal alpha-helix, present only in plant cystatins. Phytocystatins are involved in several process, including plant germination and defense. van Wyk et al. found some 19 different cystatins similar to oryzacystatin-I in the soybean along with related cysteine proteases.

1. Inhibitory Activity: Plant cystatins, like their animal counterparts, function by inhibiting cysteine proteases. By doing so, they regulate various cellular processes, including protein degradation, senescence, and defense responses.
2. Defense Mechanisms: Some plant cystatins are associated with defense mechanisms against herbivores and pathogens. When a plant is under attack, it may produce cystatins to interfere with the digestive enzymes of herbivores or the proteases of invading pathogens.
3. Tissue-Specific Expression: Different plant tissues and organs may express specific cystatin isoforms. This tissue-specific expression suggests that these proteins play distinct roles in various parts of the plant.
4. Stress Response: Plant cystatins are often implicated in the response to environmental stress. When plants face conditions such as drought, heat, or other stresses, the expression of cystatins may be altered as part of the plant's adaptive response.
5. Seed Development: Cystatins are also involved in seed development and maturation. They play a role in regulating protease activity during seed development stages.
6. Diversity: The plant kingdom exhibits a diversity of cystatins, and different plant species may have unique cystatin isoforms with specific functions. This diversity reflects the adaptability of these proteins to various ecological niches.

Understanding plant cystatins is not only important for unraveling the molecular mechanisms of plant biology but also for potential applications in agriculture. Harnessing the knowledge of cystatins in plants could contribute to the development of crops with improved resistance to pests and diseases. Ongoing research continues to explore the roles and applications of plant cystatins in diverse plant species.

== Membrane permeability ==
Chicken cystatin quickly passed the membrane of MCF-10A neo T cells and inhibited cathepsin B when it was acylated with fatty acyl residues of 6-18 carbon atoms.

== See also ==
- Affimer, a type of engineered protein that is based on the cystatin scaffold
