= Lipocalin-1 =

Protein-coding gene in the species Homo sapiens

An Error has occurred retrieving Wikidata item for infobox Lipocalin-1 is a protein that in humans is encoded by the LCN1 gene.

The protein encoded by this gene belongs to the lipocalin family. Lipocalins are a group of extracellular proteins that are able to bind lipophiles by enclosure within their structures to minimize solvent contact. This protein may bind hydrophobic ligands and inhibit cysteine proteinases. It may also play a role in taste reception.

== Structure ==
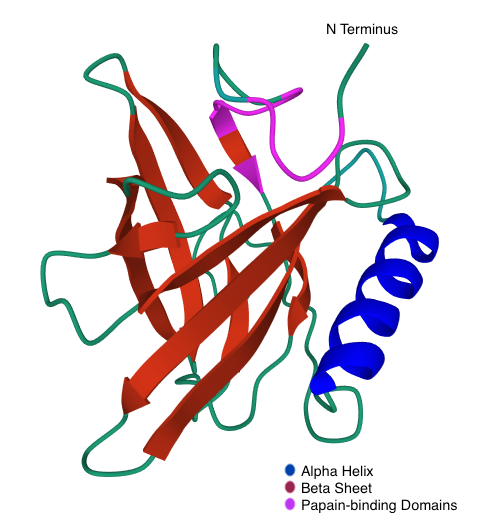
NMR Structure of LCN1

Proteins are classified into the lipocalin family by their 8 antiparallel beta-sheets that form a barrel structure which acts as the binding site for ligands.

== Function ==
Lipocalin-1 (LCN1) is capable of binding a wide variety of lipophilic molecules along with zinc and chloride ions. Because of this feature, LCN1’s main function is thought to be the removal of potentially harmful lipids and lipophilic molecules from the body by binding them. The LCN1-Ligand complex is then imported via Lipocalin-1-Interacting Membrane Receptor (LIMR) so the bound molecule can be broken down safely within the cell. This process of retrieving molecules may impact several processes including pheromone signaling, immunodulation, inflammation, detoxification, tissue development, apoptosis and more.

LCN1 shares three sequence motifs with cystatins which enables LCN1 to act in a similar manner to cystatins as a cysteine proteinase inhibitor. These domains have specifically been shown to bind Papain.

LCN1 also plays a role in stabilizing the lipid layer of the tear film, though the details of this are not yet well understood.

== History ==
Lipocalin-1 was initially thought to be produced exclusively by exocrine glands but has also been found in corticotrophs of the pituitary gland.

Alternate Names: Human Tear Prealbumin, Tear Lipocalin, von Ebner’s Gland Protein

== Clinical ==
When a cell is under stress, due to inflammation, infection, or otherwise, it will produce elevated levels of lipocalin-1 (LCN1). This makes it a potential noninvasive biomarker for various diseases. This potential has been shown in a study of IVF blastocysts, where elevated levels of LCN1 indicated aneuploidy in the blastocyst.
