= Optimer ligand =

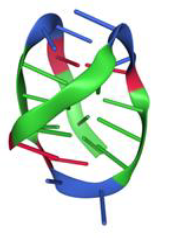
Optimer structure with non target binding groups removed for improved Optimer performance and manufacturability.

Optimer ligands are short synthetic oligonucleotide molecules composed of DNA or RNA that bind to a specific target molecule. They are engineered to bind their target molecules with affinity typically in the low nanomolar range. Optimers can be used as antibody mimetics in a range of applications, and have been optimized to increase their stability, reduce their molecular weight, and offer increased scalability and consistency in manufacture compared to standard aptamer molecules.

== Structure ==
Optimer ligands are composed of single-stranded DNA or RNA polymers. These nucleic acid molecules can exhibit cognate base-pairing to produce sections of double-stranded DNA or RNA within the Optimer molecules. Optimer ligands form secondary and tertiary structures with compatible internal base-pairing at specific portions of the ligand where possible according to the specific sequence. As not all of the bases in the Optimer sequence will be compatible for internal double-stranded pairing, single-stranded loop and bulge regions will remain in the secondary and tertiary structures, where hydrogen bond acceptor and donor groups are exposed and available to interact with the selected target for target engagement and target binding.

The Optimer library that is screened for specific binders consists of 10^{14} sequences that will form different variable sequence-dependent structures. The wide diversity in this library enables target binding to a range of different molecules. Optimer molecules can bind crevices and exposed epitopes on protein and cellular targets and can wrap around small molecule targets. This enables an increased target range compared to traditional antibody technology that has limitations in accurately binding small molecule targets.

As Optimer technology stems from aptamers, Optimer ligands have the ability to operate as reversible structural switches, changing their structure when binding their target molecule. This reversible target binding and release means the Optimer ligand is regenerated and can be used for real-time continuous sensing for biological monitoring.

== Development ==
Developed as a next generation aptamer technology, Optimer ligands were produced to improve the performance, manufacturability, and commercialisation of aptamers.

Optimer ligands are selected via an automated, high throughput in vitro screening process. 3 distinct discovery platforms are integrated into the Optimer platform for optimized discovery according to target type. Starting from a diverse library of potential nucleic acid binders, the Optimer library is refined and enriched for sequences that have the required binding characteristics including affinity, specificity, cross reactivity, and buffer compatibility. The enriched Optimer population is subsequently screened to identify the best performing Optimer ligand sequence.

Following selection of the appropriate sequence the identified Optimer undergoes a process to determine the minimum oligonucleotide fragment within this sequence that possesses the correct target-binding characteristics. The Optimer is trimmed to contain only this sequence, removing additional free non-target binding nucleotide bases. This reduces the molecular weight of the Optimer from 29 kDa to 5 kDa and increases the stability of the molecule through a reduction in entropy, as additional motion of the free nucleotides is removed.

== Optimer discovery platform ==
Three Optimer discovery platforms are used for Optimer selection. Each of the platforms is optimized to select Optimers according to the target type:

- Small molecule targets
- Protein targets
- Cells and tissues

Multiple rounds of selection and counter-selection are performed as part of each Optimer discovery process. Each discovery process can be adapted to include specific target, assay and buffer conditions to improve Optimer selection.

== Production ==
Optimer ligands are produced via solid-phase synthesis. Solid-phase chemical synthesis was invented in the 1960s by Robert Bruce Merrifield, for which he was awarded the Nobel Prize for Chemistry in 1984.

Solid-phase synthesis is carried out on a solid support held between filters, in columns that enable all reagents and solvents to pass through freely.

Solid-phase synthesis has a number of advantages over cell-based manufacturing that is typically used for protein affinity reagents, such as antibodies:

- large excesses of solution-phase reagents can be used to drive reactions quickly to completion
- impurities and excess reagents are washed away and minimal purification is required following production
- the process is amenable to automation on computer-controlled solid-phase synthesizers
- simple, automated chemical processes make production scalable with high batch-to-batch consistency
- no competition for cell-based manufacturing space for cost efficient manufacturing capacity

== Properties ==
Optimer ligands are small, synthetic molecules. The sequence of each isolated Optimer is known ensuring security of supply. These synthetic antibodies are stable for years at room temperature with no loss in performance and do not require cold chain logistics. Additionally they are non-immunogenic.

== Applications ==
Optimer technology has been developed and commercialised by Aptamer Group, which is developing these affinity reagents as biotherapeutics and diagnostic tools.

== Therapeutics ==
Optimer ligands are being investigated for use in drug discovery and development. The small size and stability profile of Optimer ligands combined with the lack of immunogenicity confer good drug-like properties on these molecules. In a similar manner to antibody therapeutics, Optimer therapeutics can be used as direct agonists or antagonists for the development of novel therapeutic moieties. Additionally, Optimers can be used as conjugates for the targeted delivery of a range of drug cargo, such as chemotherapeutics, gene silencing therapeutics, and radionuclides.

Optimer therapeutics are being developed in partnership with Cancer Research UK that can selectively target a key gene fault for the treatment of Chronic Myelomonocytic Leukaemia (CMML) and other myeloid malignancies.

Optimer conjugate therapies are being developed in partnership with AstraZeneca and PinotBio.

== Diagnostics ==
Optimer diagnostics are being developed across a number of platforms, such as biosensors, LFD and ELISA, for point-of-care diagnostics. Current partnerships include the development of COVID-19 LFD and breath test rapid antigen tests, biosensor tests for wastewater contaminants, biosensor tests for chemotherapeutic drug monitoring and biomarker discovery platforms to support drug discovery.

== Bioprocessing ==
Optimer ligands are being explored by many partners as potential affinity ligands for use in bioprocessing and as critical reagents for bioanalysis.

== See also ==
- Aptamer
