= Christiane Berger-Schaffitzel =

German biochemist

- Born: Christiane Helene Schaffitzel
- Education: University of Zürich; University of Hannover; ETH Zürich
- Scientific career
- Workplaces: University of Bristol; ETH Zürich
- Thesis: Ribosome display : in vitro selection and evolution of high affinity antibodies against proteins und nucleic acids (2001)

Christiane Helene Berger-Schaffitzel is a German biochemist and Professor at the University of Bristol. Her research considers the ribosome and translational control mechanism. Her research team identified that the SARS-CoV-2 spike protein could bind linoleic acid.

== Early life and education ==
Berger-Schaffitzel studied biochemistry in University of Hannover and ETH Zurich. She moved to the University of Zurich for her doctoral research, where she studied ribosomes and the evolution of antibodies against proteins and nucleic acids. She returned to ETH Zurich as a postdoctoral researcher in 2001, and was eventually made a lecturer.

== Research and career ==
In 2007 Berger-Schaffitzel was made team leader at the European Molecular Biology Laboratory. She was made a professor of biochemistry at the University of Bristol in 2014. Her research focusses on the complexes involved in nonsense-mediated mRNA decay. She makes use of ribosome and naïve antibody display libraries to identify neutralising binders that have high affinity against specific toxins. Supported by a European Research Council Horizon grant, Berger-Schaffitzel developed a snakebite treatment for Sub-Saharan Africa. At Bristol Berger-Schaffitzel established a facility for cryogenic electron microscopy.

During the COVID-19 pandemic Berger-Schaffitzel started working on the SARS-CoV-2 spike protein. She used cryo em to show it could bind Linoleic Acid. When Linoleic Acid binds to the spike protein it interferes with SARS-CoV-2 infection and inhibits viral replication. Following this discovery Berger-Schaffitzel founded HALO Therapeutics to create a respiratory antiviral spray for coronaviruses. In 2021 Bristol Live named Berger-Schaffitzel one of the most influential women in Bristol.

== Select publications ==
- Christiane Schaffitzel; Imre Berger; Jan Postberg; Jozef Hanes; Hans J. Lipps; Andreas Plückthun (17 July 2001). "In vitro generated antibodies specific for telomeric guanine-quadruplex DNA react with Stylonychia lemnae macronuclei". Proceedings of the National Academy of Sciences of the United States of America. 98 (15): 8572–7. Bibcode:2001PNAS...98.8572S. doi:10.1073/pnas.141229498. ISSN 0027-8424. PMC 37477. PMID 11438689. Wikidata Q28204801.
- Hanes J; Schaffitzel C; Knappik A; Plückthun A (1 December 2000). "Picomolar affinity antibodies from a fully synthetic naive library selected and evolved by ribosome display". Nature Biotechnology. 18 (12): 1287–1292. doi:10.1038/82407. ISSN 1087-0156. PMID 11101809. Wikidata Q30974237.
- Christine Toelzer; Kapil Gupta; Sathish K N Yadav; et al. (21 September 2020). "Free fatty acid binding pocket in the locked structure of SARS-CoV-2 spike protein". Science. 370 (6517): 725–730. doi:10.1126/science.abd3255. ISSN 0036-8075. PMC 8050947. PMID 32958580. Wikidata Q99593526.
