= Affilin =

Artificial proteins

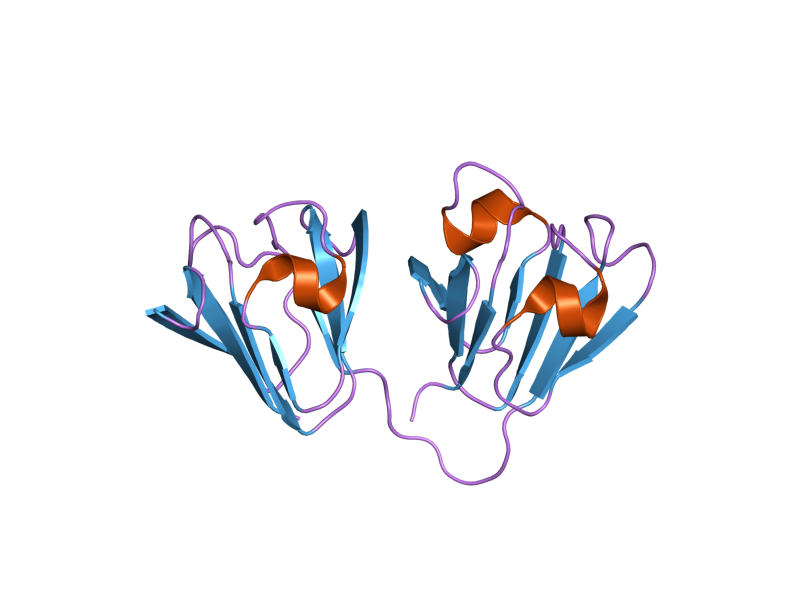
3D structure of an Affilin based on gamma-B crystallin (PDB: 2JDG)

Affilins are artificial proteins designed to selectively bind antigens. Affilin proteins are structurally derived from human ubiquitin (historically also from gamma-B crystallin). Affilin proteins are constructed by modification of surface-exposed amino acids of these proteins and isolated by display techniques such as phage display and screening. They resemble antibodies in their affinity and specificity to antigens but not in structure, which makes them a type of antibody mimetic. Affilin was developed by Scil Proteins GmbH as potential new biopharmaceutical drugs, diagnostics and affinity ligands.

== Structure ==
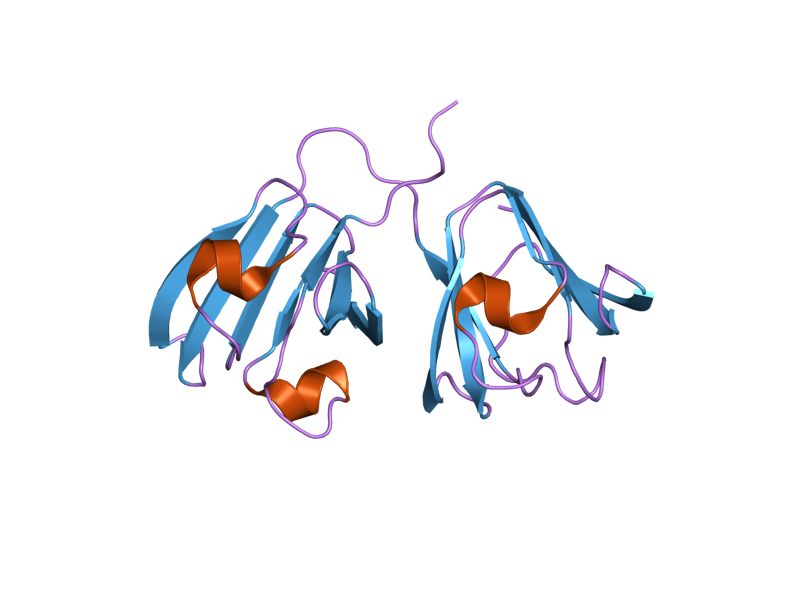
Human gamma-B crystallin, wild-type (PDB: 2JDF). The beta strands making up the beta sheets are coloured blue.

Two proteins, gamma-B crystallin and ubiquitin, have been described as scaffolds for Affilin proteins. Certain amino acids in these proteins can be substituted by others without losing structural integrity, a process creating regions capable of binding different antigens, depending on which amino acids are exchanged. In both types, the binding region is typically located in a beta sheet structure, whereas the binding regions of antibodies, called complementarity-determining regions, are flexible loops.

=== Based on gamma crystallin ===
Historically, Affilin molecules were based on gamma crystallin, a family of proteins found in the eye lens of vertebrates, including humans. It consists of two identical domains with mainly beta sheet structure and a total molecular mass of about 20 kDa. The eight surface-exposed amino acids 2, 4, 6, 15, 17, 19, 36, and 38 are suitable for modification.

=== Based on ubiquitin ===
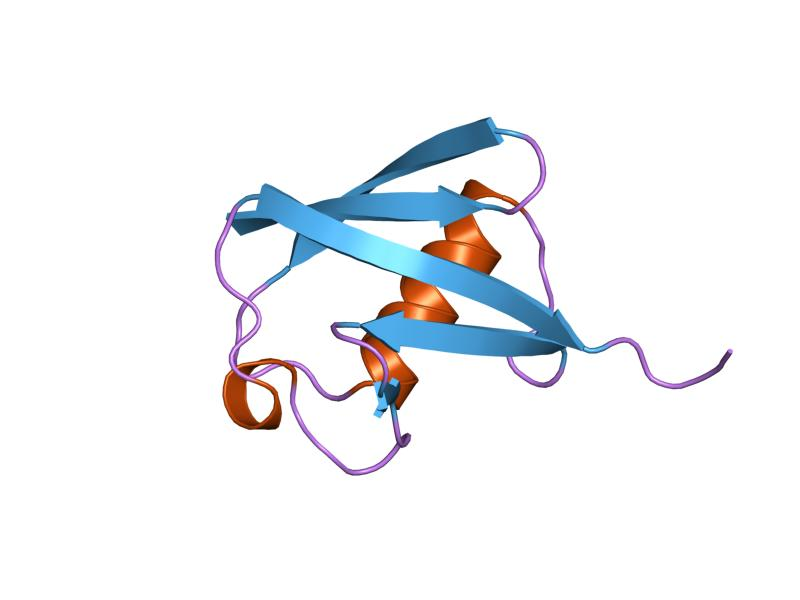
Human ubiquitin, wild-type (PDB: 1UBQ). The N-terminal beta strand is the second from top, pointing right; the C-terminal strand is the one in front, pointing right and downwards. The exchangeable amino acids are located at the top left.

Ubiquitin, as the name suggests, is a highly conserved protein occurring ubiquitously in eukaryotes. It consists of 76 amino acids in three and a half alpha helix windings and five strands constituting a beta sheet. For example, the eight surface-exposed exchangeable amino acids 2, 4, 6, 62, 63, 64, 65, and 66 are located at the beginning of the first N-terminal beta strand (2, 4, 6), at the nearby beginning of the C-terminal strand and the loop leading up to it (63–66). The resulting Affilin proteins are about 10 kDa in mass.

== Properties ==
The molecular mass of crystallin and ubiquitin based Affilin proteins is only one eighth or one sixteenth of an IgG antibody, respectively. This leads to an improved tissue permeability, heat stability up to 90 °C (195 °F), and stability towards proteases as well as acids and bases. The latter enables Affilin proteins to pass through the intestine, but like most proteins they are not absorbed into the bloodstream. Renal clearance, another consequence of their small size, is the reason for their short plasma half-life, generally a disadvantage for potential drugs.

== Production ==
Molecular libraries of Affilin proteins are generated by randomizing sets of amino acids by mutagenesis methods. Substituting selected amino acids at the potential binding site gives 19^{8} ≈ 17,000,000,000 possible combinations (e.g.: eight amino acids substituted by 19 amino acids). Cysteine is excluded because of its liability to form disulfide bonds. In an Affilin protein comprising two modified ubiquitin molecules, for example, up to 14 amino acids are exchanged, resulting in 8 × 10^{17} combinations, but not all of these are realized in a given library.

The next step is the selection of Affilin proteins that bind the desired target protein. To this end display techniques such as phage display or ribosome display are used. The fitting species are isolated and characterized physically, chemically and pharmacologically. Subsequent dimerisation or multimerisation can increase plasma half-life and, due to avidity, affinity to the target protein. Alternatively, multispecific Affilin molecules can be generated, binding different targets simultaneously. Radionuclides or cytotoxins can be conjugated to Affilin proteins, making them potential tumour therapeutics and diagnostics. Conjugation of cytokines has also been tested in vitro.

Large-scale production of Affilin proteins is facilitated by E. coli and other organisms commonly used in biotechnology.
