= Seung Bum Park =

South Korean chemist

- Occupations: Organic chemist and chemical biologist

Academic background
- Education: B.S., Chemistry; M.S., Chemistry; Ph.D., Chemistry
- Alma mater: Yonsei University; Texas A&M University

Academic work
- Institutions: Seoul National University; Asian Chemical Biology Initiative (ACBI)

Seung Bum Park (Korean: 박승범) is a South Korean organic chemist and chemical biologist. He is a deputy director and professor in the Chemistry Department at Seoul National University, as well as the CEO and founder of SPARK Biopharma in Seoul, South Korea.

Park's research has focused on discovering small-molecule therapeutic agents using chemical biology and molecular diversity, particularly through phenotypic screening to identify new candidate compounds and mechanism-of-action studies to identify target proteins in live cells. He is an elected fellow of the Korean Academy of Science and Technology (KAST) and the recipient of the 20th Kyung-Ahm Prize in Natural Science.

== Education ==
Park completed his B.S. in Chemistry and M.S. in Chemistry from Yonsei University in 1993 and 1997, respectively. Later, he earned his Ph.D. in Chemistry from Texas A&M University in 2001. Following this, he worked as a Howard Hughes Postdoctoral Fellow with Stuart L. Schreiber at the Department of Chemistry & Chemical Biology, Harvard University.

== Career ==
At Seoul National University, Park worked as an assistant professor from 2004 to 2008, an associate professor from 2008 to 2013, and has since been promoted to professor. He was the chair of the Department of Biophysics and Chemical Biology from 2018 to 2024. Between 2009 and 2011, he was the chairman of the Korean Human Proteome Organization (KHUPO).

== Research ==
Park's research has spanned chemical biology and medicinal chemistry, focusing on the synthesis and functional analysis of biologically active small molecules. He worked on the development of privileged substructure-based diversity-oriented synthesis (pDOS) to construct skeletal diversity and on its advancement in the synthesis of drug-like polyheterocyclic compounds. He has employed different approaches, including a "diversity-oriented approach of polyheterocyclic benzopyrans," the use of formic acid as both the catalyst and solvent, and the immobilization of a heterocyclic benzopyran precursor. He has also developed a "common diaza-bridged cyclic structural motif" and proposed a strategy to build distinct moderate-sized azacycles with integrated pyrimidine.

Park's work has also included studies on the development of novel fluorescent scaffold, namely Seoul-Fluor (SF), and its screening application. His research group expanded its scope to include fluorogenic and bioorthogonal probes and introduced a monochromophoric design strategy for FLTzs with a "high fluorescent turn-on/off ratio" and examined tetrazine-merged probes with fused π-systems. While working on fluorophores, he developed a set of Tz-attached multicolor fluorogenic two-photon probes. Moreover, his integrated research programs included SF-based screening assays and target protein identification.

== Awards and honors ==
- 2010 - Presidential Young Scientist Award, KAST and Korean Government
- 2010 – Jang Sae Hee Academic Excellency Award, Korean Chemical Society
- 2019 – Research Excellence Award, Seoul National University
- 2024 – 20th Kyung-Ahm Prize in Natural Science, Kyung-Ahm Foundation
- 2025 – Elected Fellow, KAST

== Selected articles ==
- Yoon, Tae-Jong; Yu, Kyeong Nam; Kim, Eunha; Kim, Jun Sung; Kim, Byung Geol; et al. (2006). "Specific Targeting, Cell Sorting, and Bioimaging with Smart Magnetic Silica Core–Shell Nanomaterials". Small. 2 (2): 209–215. Bibcode:2006Small...2..209Y. doi:10.1002/smll.200500360. PMID 17193022.
- Lee, Hyang Yeon; Park, Hyoung Kun; Lee, Yoon Mi; Kim, Kwan; Park, Seung Bum (2007). "A practical procedure for producing silver nanocoated fabric and its antibacterial evaluation for biomedical applications". Chemical Communications. 28 (28): 2959–2961. Bibcode:2007ChCom..28.2959L. doi:10.1039/B703034G. ISSN 1364-548X. PMID 17622444.
- Ju, Kuk-Youn; Lee, Yuwon; Lee, Sanghee; Park, Seung Bum; Lee, Jin-Kyu (2011). "Bioinspired Polymerization of Dopamine to Generate Melanin-Like Nanoparticles Having an Excellent Free-Radical-Scavenging Property". Biomacromolecules. 12 (3): 625–632. Bibcode:2011Biomm..12..625J. doi:10.1021/bm101281b. PMID 21319809.
- Kim, Jonghoon; Kim, Heejun; Park, Seung Bum (2014). "Privileged Structures: Efficient Chemical "Navigators" toward Unexplored Biologically Relevant Chemical Spaces". Journal of the American Chemical Society. 136 (42): 14629–14638. Bibcode:2014JAChS.13614629K. doi:10.1021/ja508343a. PMID 25310802.
- Kim, Eunha; Lee, Youngjun; Lee, Sanghee; Park, Seung Bum (2015). "Discovery, Understanding, and Bioapplication of Organic Fluorophore: A Case Study with an Indolizine-Based Novel Fluorophore, Seoul-Fluor". Accounts of Chemical Research. 48 (3): 538–547. doi:10.1021/ar500370v. PMID 25695375.
