= Synthetic antibody =

Affinity reagents generated entirely in vitro

Synthetic antibodies are affinity reagents generated entirely in vitro, thus completely eliminating animals from the production process. Synthetic antibodies include recombinant antibodies, nucleic acid aptamers and non-immunoglobulin protein scaffolds. As a consequence of their in vitro manufacturing method the antigen recognition site of synthetic antibodies can be engineered to any desired target and may extend beyond the typical immune repertoire offered by natural antibodies. Synthetic antibodies are being developed for use in research, diagnostic and therapeutic applications. Synthetic antibodies can be used in all applications where traditional monoclonal or polyclonal antibodies are used and offer many inherent advantages over animal-derived antibodies, including comparatively low production costs, reagent reproducibility and increased affinity, specificity and stability across a range of experimental conditions.

== Recombinant antibodies ==
Recombinant antibodies are monoclonal antibodies generated in vitro using synthetic genes. Recombinant antibody technology involves recovering the antibody genes from the source cells, amplifying and cloning the genes into an appropriate vector, introducing the vector into a host, and achieving expression of adequate amounts of functional antibody. Recombinant antibodies can be cloned from any species of antibody-producing animal, if the appropriate oligonucleotide primers or hybridization probes are available. The ability to manipulate the antibody genes make it possible to generate new antibodies and antibody fragments, such as Fab fragments and scFv in vitro. This can be done at the level of the whole combining site by making new combinations of H and L chains. It can also be done by mutating individual CDRs. Display libraries, commonly expressed in phage or yeast, can be analysed to select for desirable characteristics arising from such changes in antibody sequence.

== Non-immunoglobulin derived synthetic antibodies ==
These molecules typically differ in structure to that of an antibody and can be generated either from nucleic acids, as in the case of aptamers, or from non-immunoglobulin protein scaffolds / peptide aptamers, into which hypervariable loops are inserted to form the antigen binding site. Constraining the hypervariable binding loop at both ends within the protein scaffold improves the binding affinity and specificity of the synthetic antibody to levels comparable to or exceeding that of a natural antibody. Common advantages of these molecules compared to use of the typical antibody structure include a smaller size, giving improved tissue penetration, rapid generation times of weeks compared to months for natural and recombinant antibodies and cheaper costs.

== Affimer proteins ==
Affimer proteins are small robust affinity reagents, with a molecular weight of 12–14kDa. They are engineered to bind to their target proteins with high affinity and specificity and as such are a member of the synthetic antibody family.

The Affimer protein scaffold is derived from the cysteine protease inhibitor family of cystatins. Within the protein scaffold there exist two variable peptide loops and a variable N-terminal sequence that provide a high affinity binding surface for the specific target protein. Affimer binders have been produced to a large number of targets including ubiquitin chains, immunoglobulins and C-reactive protein for use in a number of molecular recognition applications. Affimer technology has been commercialised and developed by Avacta Life Sciences, who are developing Affimer binders as reagents for research, diagnostic and therapeutic applications.

== Applications ==
Synthetic antibodies have shown their utility in a number of applications. Their use within the field of research lies predominantly in the life sciences as reagents for protein capture and as protein inhibitors. Within diagnostics they have been utilised in applications ranging from infection and cancer screening to mycotoxin detection in grain samples. Synthetic antibodies are currently the fastest growing class of therapeutics.

== See also ==
- Synthetic biology – Interdisciplinary branch of biology and engineering
- Synthetic immunology – Design and construction of synthetic systems that perform complex immunological functions
