= Cystatin-11 =

Protein-coding gene in humans

An Error has occurred retrieving Wikidata item for infobox Cystatin-11 is a protein that in humans is encoded by the CST11 gene.

The cystatin superfamily encompasses proteins that contain multiple cystatin-like sequences. Some of the members are active cysteine protease inhibitors, while others have lost or perhaps never acquired this inhibitory activity.

There are three inhibitory families in the superfamily, including the type 1 cystatins (stefins), type 2 cystatins and the kininogens. The type 2 cystatin proteins are a class of cysteine proteinase inhibitors found in a variety of human fluids and secretions.

The cystatin locus on chromosome 20 contains the majority of the type 2 cystatin genes and pseudogenes. This gene is located in the cystatin locus and encodes an epididymal-specific protein whose specific function has not been determined. Alternative splicing yields two variants encoding distinct isoforms.
