= Molecular Partners =

Molecular Partners AG
- Type: Public
- Traded as: SIX: MOLN; Nasdaq: MOLN
- Industry: Biotechnology
- Founded: 2004; 22 years ago
- Headquarters: Schlieren, canton of Zürich, Switzerland
- Key people: William M. Burns (chairman of the board); Dr. Patrick Amstutz (CEO); Dr. Michael Stumpp (COO); Andreas Emmenegger (CFO); Dr. Nicolas Leupin (CMO)
- Total assets: CHF 145.6 million (Mar. 31, 2021)
- Number of employees: 152 FTE (Mar. 31, 2021)
- Website: molecularpartners.com

Molecular Partners AG is a clinical-stage biopharmaceutical company based in Zürich, Switzerland. The company is developing a new class of potent, specific and versatile small-protein therapies called DARPins, with potential clinical applications in a range of disease areas including oncology, immuno-oncology, ophthalmology, and infectious diseases. Molecular Partners currently has two DARPin molecules in clinical development, and a broad pipeline of molecules in preclinical development.

== History ==
Researchers at the University of Zürich, Switzerland formed Molecular Partners AG in 2004 while studying monoclonal antibodies. These scientists discovered and developed the DARPin technology and launched the company using this platform.

Molecular Partners became a publicly traded company in November 2014, when it was listed on the SIX Swiss Exchange (ticker MOLN).

Since July 2021, the company is also listed on the Nasdaq in the US under the ticker symbol MOLN.

== DARPins ==
DARPins are genetically engineered antibody mimetic proteins typically exhibiting highly specific and high-affinity target protein binding. They are derived from natural ankyrin repeat proteins. Repeat proteins are among the most common classes of binding proteins in nature, responsible for diverse functions such as cell signaling and receptor binding. DARPins constitute a new class of potent, specific and versatile small-protein therapies, and are used as investigational tools in various therapeutic and diagnostic applications.

The simplest format of a DARPin is the mono-DARPin, consisting of one DARPin domain with specificity for one target. The molecular mass of a mono-DARPin is about 15 to 20 kDa (kilodaltons), depending on the exact design. Several mono-DARPins can be linked (genetically or chemically) to multi-DARPins, which then combine multiple activities in one therapy. This approach enables the design of medicines that can inhibit multiple disease-specific targets and may improve outcomes for patients living with cancer, ophthalmic diseases and other disorders.

Currently, Molecular Partners has two DARPin molecules in clinical development and a broad pipeline of molecules in preclinical development.

=== Areas of Focus ===
Molecular Partners is currently focusing its DARPin platform on the fields of oncology, immuno-oncology, ophthalmology, and infectious diseases.

=== Partnerships/Business Development ===
Molecular Partners has negotiated three agreements with Allergan to develop therapies for ophthalmology (including abicipar), one in 2011 and two in 2012. In 2011, the company licensed its lead asset back then, abicipar, to Allergan. In 2012, Molecular Partners and Allergan expanded their relationship by signing two separate new agreements to discover, develop, and commercialize proprietary therapeutic DARPin products for the treatment of serious ophthalmic diseases.

Since the company's inception in 2004, Molecular Partners licensed additional DARPin candidates to other leading international pharmaceutical companies, such as Amgen, Roche or Janssen.

In October 2020, as part of a joint venture to develop therapeutic drugs to combat COVID-19, the Swiss pharmaceutical giant Novartis bought 6% of all shares outstanding in Molecular Partners at 23CHF a share.
