= Protein mimetic =

A protein mimetic is a molecule such as a peptide, a modified peptide or any other molecule that biologically mimics the action or activity of some other protein. Protein mimetics are commonly used in drug design and discovery.

== Types of mimetics ==
There are a number of different distinct classes of protein mimetics.

- Antibody mimetic - Molecules that mimic antigen binding activity of antibodies.
- Peptidomimetic - Small protein-like chains designed to mimic larger peptides.
- Phosphomimetics - An amino acid substitution or modification which mimic the effect of protein phosphorylation.

== See also ==
- Homology (biology)
