= Immunosequencing =

Method for analyzing genetic makeup

Immunosequencing, sometimes referred to as repertoire sequencing or Rep-Seq, is a method for analyzing the genetic makeup of an individual's immune system.

== Background ==
In most areas of biology a single gene codes for one or a few possible proteins. Through V(D)J recombination a number of organisms take a relatively small number of genes coding for antibodies and T-cell receptors (TCRs) and produce a huge diversity of slightly different antibodies and TCRs. The diversity allows for the recognition of a wide array of antigens. As an immune system reacts to infections and other events, the number of different antibodies and TCRs it contains changes. The makeup and quantity of these proteins is sometimes referred to as an immune repertoire.

Immunosequencing is a technique utilizing multiplex polymerase chain reaction that allows for the sequencing and quantification of the large diversity of antibody and TCR genes composing an individual's immune repertoire.

== History ==
Immunosequencing in its modern context started being discussed in scientific literature in the early 2010s with the advent of more powerful gene sequencing techniques.
