= Synthetic immunology =

Design and construction of synthetic systems that perform complex immunological functions

Synthetic immunology is the rational design and construction of synthetic systems that perform complex immunological functions. Functions include using specific cell markers to target cells for destruction and or interfering with immune reactions. US Food and Drug Administration (FDA)-approved immune system modulators include anti-inflammatory and immunosuppressive agents, vaccines, therapeutic antibodies and Toll-like receptor (TLR) agonists.

== History ==
The discipline emerged after 2010 following the development of genome editing technology including TALENS and CRISPR. In 2015, one project created T cells that became active only in the presence of a specific drug, allowing them to be turned on and off in situ. Another example is a T cell that targets only cells that display two separate markers.

In 2016, John Lin head of Pfizer's San Francisco biotech unit stated, "the immune system will be the most convenient vehicle for [engineered human cells], because they can move and migrate and play such important roles."

Advances in systems biology support high-dimensional quantitative analysis of immune responses. Techniques include viral gene delivery, inducible gene expression, RNA-guided genome editing, and site-specific recombinases for applications related to biotechnology and cellular immunotherapy.

In, 2017, the United States Food and Drug Administration approved tisagenlecleucel, the first chimeric antigen receptor T cell (CAR-T) therapy, for patients up to 25 years old with B cell precursor acute lymphoblastic leukemia that was refractory or in second or later relapse. Tisagenlecleucel consists of a patient's T cells genetically modified to express a receptor targeting CD19 on B cells. Its approval represented the first authorization in the United States of a gene transfer therapy and established genetically engineered immune cells as a clinically viable form of cancer treatment.

Following the first CAR-T approvals, research in synthetic immunology expanded beyond receptors that recognize a single tumor associated antigen. Researchers developed combinatorial receptor systems, synthetic gene circuits, controllable cytokine signaling, and engineered immune cell types intended to improve the specificity, regulation, and durability of cell therapies. These designs have sought to address limitations such as antigen escape, activity against healthy tissues, limited persistence, and suppression of immune cells within solid tumors.

In 2024, the FDA granted accelerated approval to lifileucel for certain adults with unresectable or metastatic melanoma. Lifileucel is produced by isolating naturally occurring tumor infiltrating lymphocytes from a patient's tumor and expanding them outside the body; unlike CAR-T and engineered TCR therapies, the cells are not genetically modified. Later that year, the FDA approved afamitresgene autoleucel for certain adults with unresectable or metastatic synovial sarcoma. Afamitresgene autoleucel became the first FDA approved T cell receptor gene therapy and uses autologous T cells engineered to express a receptor that recognizes the tumor antigen MAGE-A4.

== Types ==
=== Immunity-modulating organisms ===
Researchers are exploring the creation of 'smart' organisms such as bacteriophages and bacteria that can perform complex immunological tasks. Such strategies could produce organisms that perform multistep immune functions such as presenting antigen to and co-stimulating helper T cells in a specific manner, or providing integrated signals to B cells to induce affinity maturation and isotype switching during antibody production. Such engineered organisms have the potential be as safe and as inexpensive as probiotics but precise in carrying out targeted interventions.

=== Antibody-recruiting small molecules ===
Antibody therapeutics and other 'biologics' have proven to be effective in treating a diseases from rheumatoid arthritis to cancer. However, such agents are expensive and administered by injection which can cause unwanted anaphylactic or inflammatory reactions. Small molecules, in contrast, are generally inexpensive to produce, orally bioavailable and are rarely allergenic. Synthetic antibody-recruiting small molecules have been created that redirect natural antibodies to pathogens for destruction.

=== Transdifferentiated cells ===
Deletion of a single transcription factor enables mature B cells to transform into T cells via dedifferentiation and redifferentiation. Technologies that can control cell fate include strategies to induce pluripotent stem cell formation and using small molecules to induce stem cells to differentiate into specific cell types. Dedifferentiation could be used to turn autoimmune cells into inactive progenitors or to suppress rejection of transplanted organs.

In 2016 researchers transdifferentiated fibroblasts into induced neural stem cells. The team mixed the cells into an FDA-approved surgical glue that provided a physical support matrix. They administered the result to mice. Survival times increased from 160 to 220 percent, depending on the type of tumor.

=== Vaccines ===
Therapeutic vaccines treat and immunize patients already infected with a given disease. Provenge is an adoptive cell-transfer therapy in which a patient's antigen-presenting target autologous prostate cancer tissue. Advances in chemical biology include synthetic molecules that modulate B cell activation, structurally complex carbohydrate tumor antigen and adjuvants synthesis, immunogenic chemotherapeutic agents and chemically homogeneous, synthetic vaccines.

=== Synthetic immune receptors ===
Synthetic immune receptors are engineered proteins that alter how immune cells detect and respond to extracellular antigen binding region, commonly derived from an antibody, with a transmembrane region and intracellular signaling domains. This design allows a T cell or another immune cell to recognize a surface antigen without requiring the antigen to be processed and presented by a major histocompatibility complex molecule. By contrast, T cell receptor engineering introduces or modifies a TCR that recognizes a specific peptide-MHC complex. Engineered TCRs can therefore target proteins located inside a cell, provided that peptides derived from those proteins are presented at the cell surface.

Other synthetic immune receptors are intended to provide greater control over cellular responses. Synthetic Notch receptors, generally called SynNotch receptors, connect recognition of a selected extracellular antigen to activation of a chosen gene. An engineered cell can consequently be programmed to produce a cytokine, express a CAR, or activated another genetic program only after encountering the first antigen, SynNotch and related systems can create logic like responses in which a combinations of antigens determine whether the cell becomes active. Such circuits are being investigated as a way to distinguish diseased tissue from healthy tissue more precisely than receptors controlled by a single antigen.

Receptor activity can also be placed under external or environmental control. Experimental systems have been designed to respond to small molecule drugs, proteases, hypoxia, inflammatory signals, or other characteristics of diseased tissue. These mechanisms may provide control over the location, timing, or intensity of an engineered immune response, although many remain in preclinical development.

=== Gene circuits and cellular programming ===
Synthetic gene circuits are combinations of regulatory DNA, RNA, and proteins designed to control how an engineered cell processes information and responds to its environment. Whereas a conventional CAR generally connects recognition of one antigen directly to cellular activation, gene circuits can require multiple conditions to be satisfied before the cell produces a response. These systems apply concepts analogous to Boolean logic, including AND, OR, and NOT gates, although their behavior within living cells may be less exact than that of electronic circuits.

An AND gate circuit requires two or more signals for full activation. For example, one tumor antigen may activate a synNotch receptor that induces expression of a CAR targeting a second antigen. The engineered cell preferentially attacks tissue displaying the intended combination of antigens because the CAR is produced only after the first antigen has been detected. OR gate systems allow activation through either of two targets and are being investigated as a response to antigen heterogeneity and antigen escape, in which tumor cells survive by losing or reducing expression of the antigen escape in which tumor cells survive by losing or reducing expression of the antigen targeted by a therapy. NOT gate systems use recognition of an antigen associated with healthy tissue to inhibit activation potentially protecting cells that share a target antigen with the tumor.

Gene circuits can also regulate the intensity or duration of immune cell activity. Feedback circuits may increase a response after antigen recognition or reduce it when signaling becomes excessive. Inducible promoters can restrict production of cytokines and other therapeutic proteins to a particular cellular state or tissue environment. Other designs use small molecule drugs as external switches that activate, suppress, or eliminate engineered cells. Such control systems are intended to make cell therapies more specific and adjustable, but increasing circuit complexity can create difficulties involving genetic stability, variable expression, delayed response, and manufacturing.

=== Engineered cytokines and cytokine signaling ===
Cytokines often have short circulation times and can act on multiple cell populations, which may require frequent or high dose administration and increase the risk of systemic toxicity. Engineering strategies have therefore been developed to alter cytokine activity, extend cytokine persistence, direct cytokines toward selected tissues, or change how engineered immune cells respond to cytokine signals.

Protein engineering can change how strongly a cytokine binds to different receptor subunits and thereby alter which cell populations respond. Engineered forms of IL-2 have been designed either to favor cytotoxic T cells and natural killer cells or favor regulatory T cells. Stimulation of cytotoxic cells may be useful in cancer treatment, whereas preferential stimulation of regulatory T cells is being investigated for autoimmune and inflammatory diseases. Cytokines may also be fused or conjugated to antibodies, albumin, immunoglobulin Fc regions, polymers, or other carriers to extend their circulation or concentrate their activity in selected tissues. Antibody-cytokine fusion proteins directed toward a target antigen are commonly called immunocytokines.

Immune cells can also be genetically modified to produce cytokines. These cells, sometimes described as armored CAR-T cells, have been engineered to express cytokines including IL-12, IL-15, and IL-18 to support T cell expansion, persistence, or activity within the tumor microenvironment. Some designs connect cytokine expression to activation of the engineered cell, with the aim of concentrating cytokine activity near antigen positive tissue. However, secreted cytokines may also affect surrounding unmodified immune cells, and increased cytokine signaling can raise the risk of systemic inflammation or cytokine release syndrome.

Synthetic cytokine receptors change the relationship between an extracellular signal and the intracellular response it produces. For example, a receptor can use the extracellular domain of a receptor for an immunosuppressive cytokine while using intracellular domains that promote T cell proliferation or activity. Such designs try to convert signals found in an immunosuppressive tumor environment into signals that support the engineered cell. Most cytokine secreting CAR T cells and synthetic cytokine receptor systems gave been evaluated primarily in preclinical models, but some have entered early clinical testing.

== Therapeutic applications ==
Cancer treatment is the most clinically developed application of synthetic immunology. Approved CAR T cell therapies target CD19 in certain B cell leukemias and lymphomas. CARs generally recognize antigens displayed on the cell surface. Engineered TCRs recognize peptides presented by MHC molecules and can therefore target peptides derived from intracellular as well as surface proteins. Strategies being investigated for solid tumors include multi antigen receptors, logic gated circuits, localized cytokine expression, and modifications for protecting engineered cells from suppressive signals within the tumor microenvironment.

Engineered immune cells are also being investigated for autoimmune and inflammatory diseases. CD19 directed CAR T cells can deplete broad populations of B cells, including B cells involved in autoantibody production. More selective chimeric autoantibody receptor T cells use an autoantigen as their extracellular recognition domain. These cells are designed to eliminate only B cells whose B cell receptors recognize that autoantigen l, although this approach has mainly been demonstrated in preclinical models.

Regulatory T cells are being engineered for purposes that differ from cancer directed cytotoxic therapies. Since regulatory T cells suppress immune activation and contribute to immune tolerance, CAR or TCR engineered regulatory T cells are being studied for transplant rejection. Antigen specific receptors are intended to direct the cells toward selected tissues and concentrate their suppressive activity near the relevant antigen. This potentially reduces unintended systemic immunosuppression, but their stability, persistence, and safety require further investigation.

In transplantation, regulatory T cells have been engineered to recognize donor human leukocyte antigens expressed by transplanted tissue. Preclinical studies suggesting that these cells can localize to grafts and suppress immune responses against them. The goal is to promote transplant specific tolerance while preserving more of the recipient's general immune function, but engineered regulatory T cells have not yet replaced conventional systemic immunosuppression in clinical transplantation..

Engineered immune cells have also been investigated for infectious diseases. Experimental CARs and engineered TCRs can direct T cells toward cells infected with viruses such as HIV, hepatitis, or cytomegalovirus. Potential difficulties include viral mutation, limited persistence of the engineered cells, damage to infected but functionally important tissues, and the ability of some pathogens to make latent reservoirs. Synthetic biology methods are also being applied to vaccines and antigen presenting cells to control when, where, and how antigens or immunostimulatory signals are produced.

== Safety and limitations ==
The therapeutic activity of engineered immune cells can also produce serious adverse effects. CAR T therapies can cause cytokine release syndrome, a systemic inflammatory response associated with extensive immune cell activation, and immune effector cell associated neurotoxicity syndrome. Therapies targeting an antigen that is present on both diseased and healthy cells can produce on target, off tumor toxicity. This occurs even when the receptor correctly recognizes its intended antigen because the antigen itself is not restricted to diseased tissue.

Synthetic control systems are being developed to reduce these risks. Suicide switches can induce death of the engineered cells following administration of a drug, while reversible pharmacological switches can temporarily increase or decrease receptor activity. Logic gated receptors attempt to restrict activation to cells displaying selected antigen combinations. Other systems control the abundance, localization, or timing of receptor and cytokine expression. These mechanisms may improve safety but can also fail to act rapidly enough, respond incompletely, or increase the difficulty of producing and testing the therapy.

Tumor evolution creates additional limitations. A tumor may contain cell populations with different antigen expression, and treatment can select for cells that lack the targeted antigen. This process is known as antigen escape and can lead to relapse after an initially effective therapy. Multi-target receptors and OR gate circuits are intended to reduce escape by allowing engineered cells to recognize more than one antigen. Conversely, adding targets may increase the possibility of recognizing healthy tissue, creating a trade off between broader tumor recognition and specificity.

== See also ==
- Synthetic antibody – Affinity reagents generated entirely in vitro
- Synthetic biology – Interdisciplinary branch of biology and engineering
