= DARPin =

Type of genetically engineered antibody mimetic protein

DARPins (an acronym for designed ankyrin repeat proteins) are genetically engineered antibody mimetic proteins typically exhibiting highly specific and high-affinity target protein binding. They are derived from natural ankyrin repeat proteins, one of the most common classes of binding proteins in nature, which are responsible for diverse functions such as cell signaling, regulation and structural integrity of the cell. DARPins consist of at least three repeat motifs or modules, of which the most N- and the most C-terminal modules are referred to as "caps", since they shield the hydrophobic core of the protein. The number of internal modules is indicated as number (e.g. N1C, N2C, N3C, ...) while the caps are indicated with "N" or "C", respectively. The molecular mass of e.g. 14 or 18 kDa (kilodaltons) for four- (N2C) or five- (N3C) repeat DARPins is rather small for a biologic (ca 10% of the size of an IgG).

DARPins constitute a new class of potent, specific and versatile small-protein therapeutics, and are used as investigational tools in various research, diagnostic and therapeutic applications. Molecular Partners AG, a clinical-stage biopharmaceutical company with several DARPin molecules in clinical and preclinical development, is currently pursuing development of therapeutic DARPins both through their own development and in parallel with partners. Athebio AG builds on further improving the DARPin scaffold for a partnering model approach.

In addition, DARPins can be used as crystallization chaperones for soluble and membrane proteins, including G protein-coupled receptors (GPCRs), either as binding partners or as rigid fusions to the target protein, a concept now being extended to structure determination by cryoEM.

== Origin, structure and generation ==
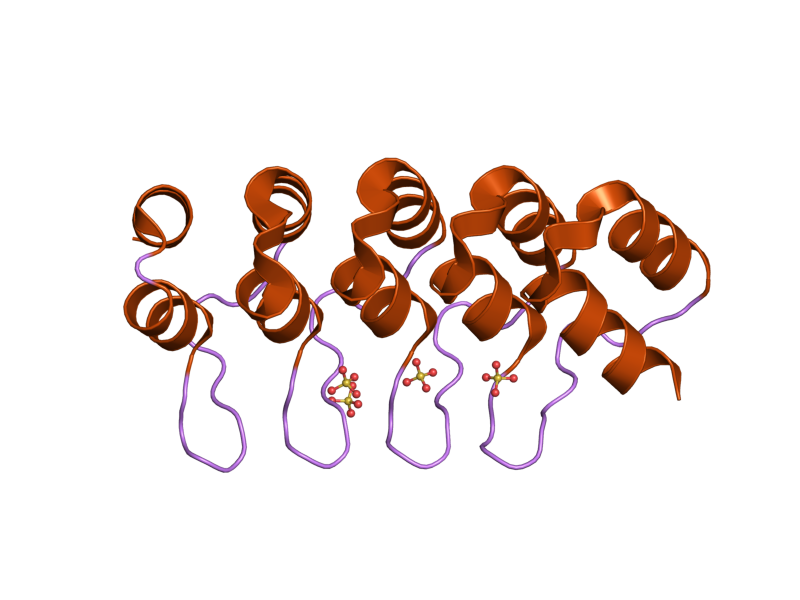
A DARPin with five ankyrin repeat motifs (PDB: 2QYJ)

The DARPin platform was discovered and developed in the laboratory of Andreas Plückthun at the University of Zurich, Switzerland while studying engineering and libraries of recombinant antibodies. DARPins are derived from naturally occurring ankyrin proteins, a protein class that mediates high-affinity protein-protein interactions in nature.

DARPin libraries were designed via sequence alignments of several thousand natural ankyrin repeat motifs (of about 33 amino acids each) combined with structure-based design and recombinant DNA methods. These proteins consist of repetitive structural units that form a stable protein domain with a large potential target interaction surface. Typically, DARPins comprise four or five repeats, of which the first (N-capping repeat) and last (C-capping repeat) serve to shield the hydrophobic protein core from the aqueous environment. DARPins correspond to the average size of natural ankyrin repeat protein domains. Proteins with fewer than three repeats (i.e., the capping repeats and one internal repeat) do not form a stable enough tertiary structure. The molecular mass of a DARPin depends on the total number of repeats, as shown in the following chart:

Repeats	3	4	5	6	7	...
Approximate mass (kDa)	10	14	18	22	26	...

Libraries of DARPins with randomized potential target interaction residues have been generated at the DNA level. From these libraries, biochemists can select DARPins to bind the target of choice with picomolar affinity and specificity can be selected using ribosome display or phage display using signal sequences allowing cotranslational secretion. DARPins can be designed to act as receptor agonists, antagonists, inverse agonists, enzyme inhibitors, or simple target protein binders.

== Properties and potential benefits of DARPins ==
DARPins are expressed in the cytoplasm of Escherichia coli at high levels (over 10 g/L in fermentation, 1 g/L in shake flask) in soluble form. The proteins exhibit high thermal and thermodynamic stability (denaturation midpoint: usually equilibrium unfolding: ∆G > 9.5 kcal/mol) increasing with increasing repeat number. DARPins are stable in human blood serum and can be engineered so as not to contain T-cell epitopes.

Due to the high specificity, stability, potency and affinity, as well as their flexible architecture, DARPins have a rigid body-binding mode. Multi-specific or multivalent constructs made by genetic fusion suggest that fused DARPins have similar binding properties as single-domain DARPins. The absence of cysteines in the scaffold enables engineering of site-specific cysteines, allowing site-directed coupling of chemicals to the molecule. Non-natural amino acids can be introduced for the same purpose.

Potentially, DARPins can provide clinical benefit by overcoming the limitations of conventional therapeutic approaches, which typically target a single disease pathway and thus may compromise efficacy. In many cases, the complexity of a disease results from the dysregulation of multiple pathways. DARPin technology can be leveraged to rapidly generate thousands of different "multi-DARPins" where the binding domains are connected (i.e., by linkers), thereby enabling the targeting of several disease pathways. DARPins and multi-DARPins can also be fused to non-DARPin elements, such as a toxin, to generate targeted therapeutics, and their manufacture is facilitated by the resistance of DARPins against aggregation. The diversity of formats and robustness of multi-DARPins facilitates an empirical approach (such as through outcome-based screening) to efficiently identify DARPins with potential activity in specific disease pathways.

The potential benefits of DARPins are largely due to their structural and biophysical characteristics. Their small size (14-18 kDa) is thought to enable increased tissue penetration, and their high potency (<5-100 pM) makes DARPins active at low concentrations. DARPins are soluble at >100 g/L, and their high stability and solubility are considered desirable properties for drug compounds. DARPins can be produced rapidly and cost-efficiently (i.e., from E. coli). Their pharmacokinetic (PK) properties can be adjusted by fusion to half-life extending molecules, such as polyethylene glycol (PEG), or to DARPins binding to human serum albumin. Because of their favorable biophysical properties, DARPins are considered highly developable using standard processes, potentially exhibiting robust class behavior.

== Clinical development and applications ==
DARPins have been used as research tools, as diagnostic agents and as therapeutic agents. MP0112, the first DARPin candidate in the clinic, is a vascular endothelial growth factor (VEGF) inhibitor and entered clinical trials for the treatment of wet age-related macular degeneration (wet AMD, also known as neovascular age-related macular degeneration) and diabetic macular edema in early 2010.

Currently, MP0112 is being investigated in three different clinical trials. The first two trials are safety and efficacy studies of abicipar in patients with wet AMD to establish comparability between Japanese and non-Japanese patients. The third study is to test the safety and efficacy of abicipar in patients with DME.

In July 2014, Molecular Partners initiated a first-in-human study to investigate the safety, tolerability and blood levels of MP0250, a second DARPin candidate, in patients with cancer.

Molecular Partners AG has several additional DARPins in preclinical development with potential indications in various disease areas, including ophthalmology, oncology, immuno-oncology and immunology.
