= Avimer =

Avimers (short for avidity multimers) are artificial proteins that are able to specifically bind to certain antigens via multiple binding sites. Since they are not structurally related to antibodies, they are classified as a type of antibody mimetic. Avimers have been developed by the biotechnology company Avidia, now part of Amgen, as potential new pharmaceutical drugs.

== Structure ==
Avimers consist of two or more peptide sequences of 30 to 35 amino acids each, connected by linker peptides. The individual sequences are derived from A domains of various membrane receptors and have a rigid structure, stabilised by disulfide bonds and calcium. Each A domain can bind to a certain epitope of the target protein. The combination of domains binding to different epitopes of the same protein increases affinity to this protein, an effect known as avidity (hence the name).

Alternatively, the domains can be directed against epitopes on different target proteins. This approach is similar to the one taken in the development of bispecific monoclonal antibodies. In a study, the plasma half-life of an anti-interleukin 6 avimer could be increased by extending it with an anti-immunoglobulin G domain.

== Properties ==
Avimers with two or three domains can bind to their targets in sub-nanomolar concentrations. They have improved heat stability compared with antibodies, but limited plasma half-life because of their smaller size. Half-life can be increased by binding them to antibodies.

== Production ==
A library theoretically containing up to 10^{23} different A domains serves as a starting point for the development of avimers. Domains targeting the desired protein are selected with display techniques such as phage display. The most promising species are linked to a second A domain via a short linker peptide, forming a new library. This process can be repeated several times, yielding avimers with an increasing number of domains.
