= NanoCLAMP =

Immunology reagent

In the medical field of immunology, nanoCLAMP (CLostridal Antibody Mimetic Proteins) affinity reagents are recombinant 15 kD antibody mimetic proteins selected for tight, selective and gently reversible binding to target molecules. The nanoCLAMP scaffold is based on an IgG-like, thermostable carbohydrate binding module family 32 (CBM32) from a Clostridium perfringens hyaluronidase (Mu toxin). The shape of nanoCLAMPs approximates a cylinder of approximately 4 nm in length and 2.5 nm in diameter, roughly the same size as a nanobody (PDB: 2W1Q). nanoCLAMPs to specific targets are generated by varying the amino acid sequences and sometimes the length of three solvent exposed, adjacent loops that connect the beta strands making up the beta-sandwich fold, conferring binding affinity and specificity for the target.

== Properties ==
nanoCLAMPs are the first antibody mimetics described to be polyol-responsive, meaning they release their targets upon exposure to a non-chaotropic salt and a polyol, such as propylene glycol. This property has been shown to be useful for purifying functional proteins and protein complexes by affinity purification. nanoCLAMPs are easily produced in the cytoplasm of E. coli, with typical yields in the range of 50 to 300 mg/L culture. Because nanoCLAMPs are devoid of cysteines, an engineered C-terminal cysteine can be used for site-directed conjugation of entities like fluorophores or resins using thiol-chemistry.

== Development and applications ==
nanoCLAMPs were developed in the laboratories of Nectagen. nanoCLAMP phage display libraries were constructed that contained variations on 16 surface amino acids in three loops with function diversities of approximately 10^{9} variants. These libraries have been screened for binders to target proteins and peptides, typically yielding between 1 and 30 unique binders to the target.

Purified nanoCLAMPs containing a single C-terminal cysteine can be easily conjugated to halo-acetyl activated agarose resins under native or denaturing conditions, and the resulting thioether bond renders the resins leach-proof. Targets can be purified to apparent homogeneity in a single-step. The polyol-responsive nature of the resins allows the targets to be eluted with 0.75 M ammonium sulfate and 40% propylene glycol at pH 7.9, conditions which have been shown to preserve native structure and protein complexes.

nanoCLAMPs have been produced that target green fluorescent protein (GFP), mCherry, SUMO (SMT3), NusA, avidin, NeutrAvidin, maltose-binding protein (MBP), thioredoxin 1, beta-galactosidase, SlyD, and others. Typical binding capacities of resins range from 1 to 4 mg/ml resin. Because nanoCLAMPs readily refold, nanoCLAMP resins can be regenerated multiple times using guanidinium chloride to clean the resin.
