= Andreas Plückthun =

German-Swiss biochemist and protein engineer

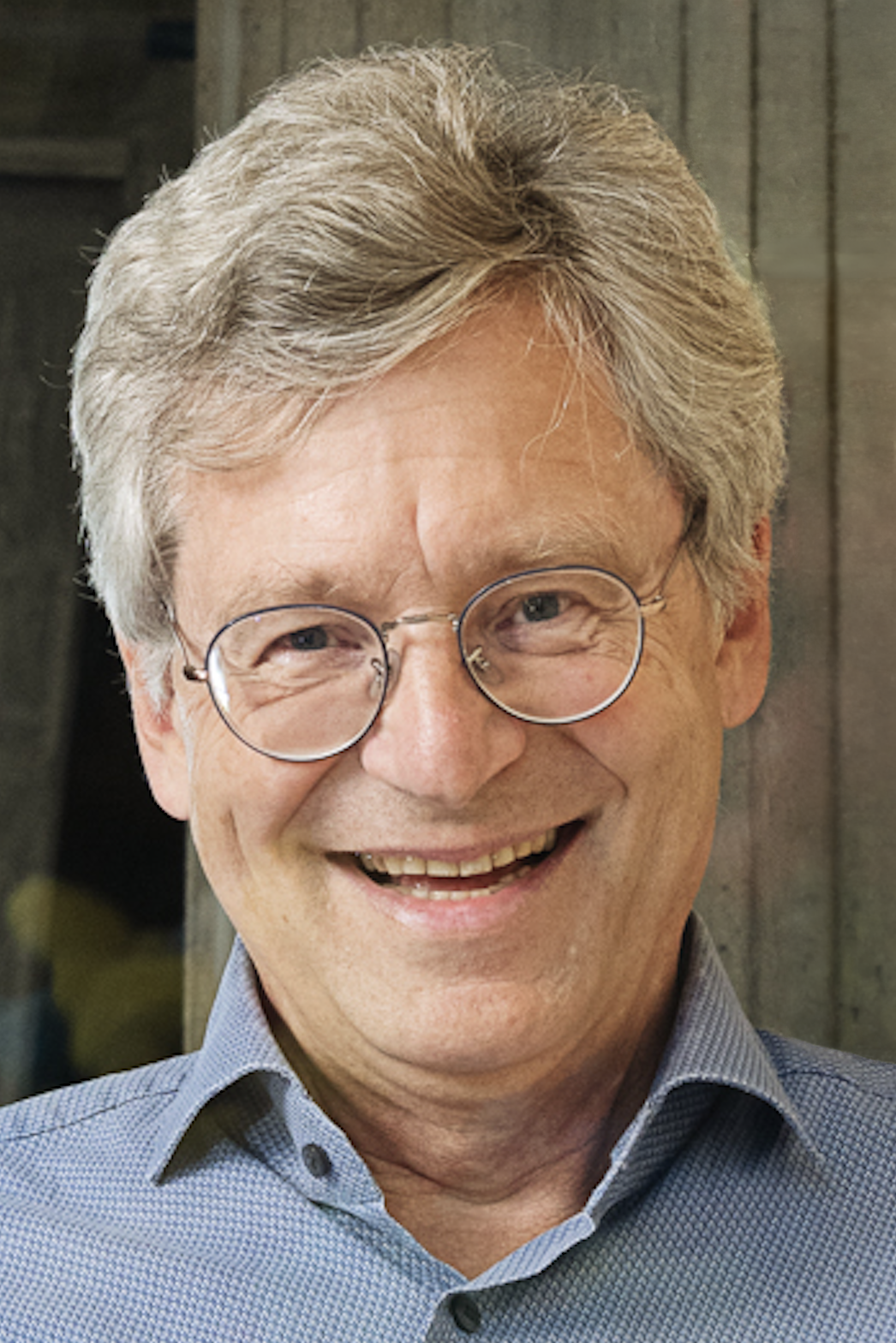
- Born: May 7, 1956; Heidelberg, Germany
- Citizenship: German, Swiss
- Education: University of Heidelberg; University of California, San Diego
- Awards: Christian B. Anfinsen Award (2016); Wilhelm-Exner Medal (2002); Karl-Heinz Beckurts Prize (2000)
- Scientific career
- Fields: Biochemistry; protein engineering; directed evolution
- Workplaces: University of Zurich (1993–present); Max Planck Institute for Biochemistry (1985–1993)
- Thesis: (1982)
- Doctoral advisor: Edward A. Dennis (1978–1982)

Andreas Plückthun (born May 7, 1956) is a German–Swiss biochemist and protein engineer, known for foundational contributions to antibody engineering, directed evolution technologies, and the development of alternative binding proteins. He has been a full professor of biochemistry at the University of Zurich since 1993 and is widely recognized for pioneering work that has influenced both academic research and the biotechnology industry.

His research has played a central role in establishing modern protein engineering as a discipline, particularly through the development of synthetic antibody libraries, ribosome display, and Designed Ankyrin Repeat Proteins (DARPins), which have been translated into clinical and industrial applications.

== Early life and education ==
Plückthun studied chemistry at Heidelberg University before pursuing graduate studies at the University of California, San Diego, where he obtained a Ph.D. in 1982 under Edward Dennis. His doctoral work focused on enzymatic catalysis at interfaces.

He subsequently conducted postdoctoral research at Harvard University (1982–1985) with Jeremy Knowles, working on protein transport through the membrane in bacteria.

== Career ==
From 1985 to 1993, Plückthun held research leadership positions in Germany, including group leader roles at the Gene Center Munich and the Max Planck Institute of Biochemistry. In 1993, he was appointed full professor of biochemistry at the University of Zurich, where he has led a research program focused on protein engineering, design, and evolution.

Over his career, he has trained a large number of scientists, including more than 120 doctoral students and dozens of postdoctoral researchers, many of whom have gone on to academic and industry leadership roles.

== Research ==
=== Antibody engineering and synthetic libraries ===
Plückthun's early work demonstrated the expression of functional antibody fragments in Escherichia coli, thereby overcoming a major technical barrier in recombinant antibody production. This work enabled the development of modern antibody engineering techniques and laid the groundwork for the first fully synthetic antibody libraries.

These libraries, including modular combinatorial systems, allowed rapid generation of antibodies without immunization and have since become widely used in both research and therapeutic development. Several antibodies derived from such technologies have been translated into clinical applications.

=== Designed Ankyrin Repeat Proteins (DARPins) ===
Building on insights from antibody stability and folding, Plückthun developed Designed Ankyrin Repeat Proteins (DARPins), a class of engineered binding proteins designed to overcome limitations of conventional antibodies.

DARPins exhibit high stability, strong binding affinity, and efficient expression across multiple systems. They have been developed into therapeutic candidates and research tools, including applications targeting intracellular proteins and complex biological pathways.

=== Ribosome display and directed evolution ===
Plückthun introduced ribosome display, a cell-free system for protein evolution that allows the selection of high-affinity binders from extremely large libraries. As it can directly incorporate mutagenesis by e.g. error-prone PCR, it can truly evolve a protein sequence. This method expanded the scale and efficiency of directed evolution beyond cell-based approaches.

Using ribosome display, proteins have been evolved to achieve very high binding affinities, and specialized variants of the method have been developed to improve protein stability and folding efficiency. These technologies have become widely adopted tools in protein engineering and biotechnology.

=== Engineering of membrane proteins and GPCRs ===
His group developed methods to evolve and stabilize G protein-coupled receptors (GPCRs), a class of membrane proteins that are central drug targets but difficult to study structurally.

By combining directed evolution with high-throughput selection techniques, these methods enabled improved expression, stability, and structural analysis of GPCRs using crystallography, cryo-electron microscopy, and other approaches, as well as enabling the direct high-throughput screening for binding of ligands.

=== Gene delivery and synthetic virus-like particles ===
More recently, Plückthun's research has focused on precision gene delivery systems based on engineered virus-like particles derived from adenoviruses. These systems are designed to selectively target specific cell types based on their surface receptors, while avoiding immune detection.

Applications demonstrated in preclinical models include targeted delivery to tumor cells and immune cells, enabling localized therapeutic expression of antibodies and cytokines.

== Entrepreneurial contributions ==
Plückthun has played a key role in translating academic research into biotechnology ventures:

- Co-founder of MorphoSys AG (1992), based on antibody engineering technologies, later acquired by Novartis
- Co-founder of Molecular Partners AG (2004), developing DARPin-based therapeutics
- Co-founder of G7 Therapeutics, focused on GPCR-targeted drug discovery (later integrated into Nxera Pharma)

== Awards and honors ==
- Christian B. Anfinsen Award of the Protein Society (2016)
- European Research Council (ERC) Senior Investigator Grant (2011)
- ERC Synergy Grant (2018)
- Wilhelm-Exner Medal (2002)
- Grand Prix Européen d'Innovation (2002)
- J.P. Morgan Chase Health Award (2002)
- Karl-Heinz Beckurts Prize (2000)
- Young Investigator Award of the German Chemical Industry (1990)
- Member of European Molecular Biology Organization (EMBO)
- Member of German Academy of Sciences (Leopoldina)

== Scientific impact ==
Plückthun has authored more than 550 scientific publications, with over 60,000 citations and an h-index exceeding 130, reflecting sustained influence across multiple areas of protein science.

His work spans fundamental biochemical research, methodological innovation, and translational applications, contributing to advances in therapeutic antibody development, protein design, and targeted gene delivery.

== Legacy and influence ==
Plückthun's contributions have enabled technologies that are widely used in both academic research and the biotechnology industry, bridging the gap between fundamental science and clinical application.

His work continues to influence fields including antibody therapeutics, structural biology, and synthetic biology, with ongoing research expanding into targeted gene delivery and precision medicine approaches as well as new approaches to design binding molecules.
