= Affitin =

Artificial protein that selectively binds antigens

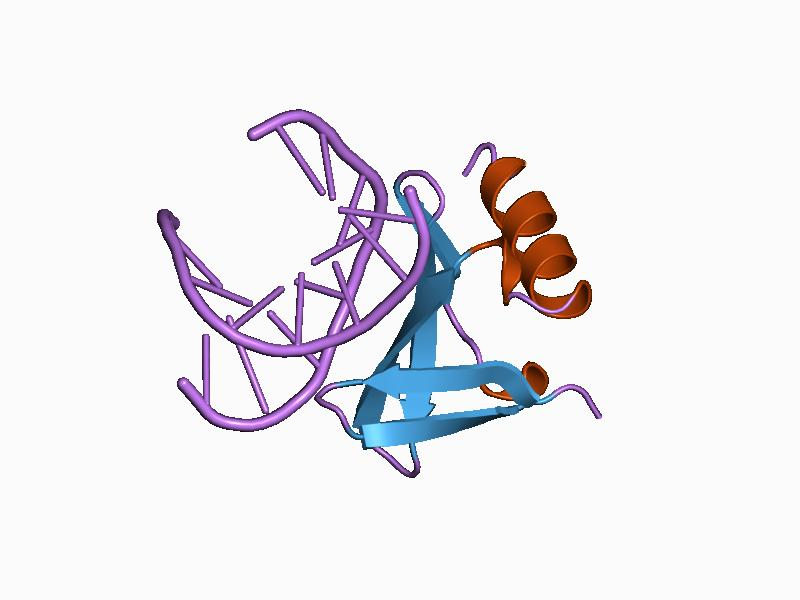
Wild-type Sac7d (blue and orange) kinking DNA (lilac), from PDB: 1AZP

Affitins (commercial name Nanofitins) are artificial proteins with the ability to selectively bind antigens. They are structurally derived from the DNA binding protein Sac7d, found in Sulfolobus acidocaldarius, a microorganism belonging to the archaeal domain. By randomizing the amino acids on the binding surface of Sac7d and subjecting the resulting protein library to rounds of ribosome display, the affinity can be directed towards various targets, such as peptides, proteins, viruses, and bacteria.

Affitins are antibody mimetics and are being developed as an alternative to antibodies as tools in biotechnology. They have also been used as specific inhibitors for various enzymes. Affitins can be utilized in biochemical purification techniques, specifically in affinity chromatography. The ability of Affitins to selectively bind antigens is used to target specific proteins.

Scientists have been able to purify human immunoglobulin G (hIgG), bacterial PulD protein, and chicken egg lysozyme using Affitin columns with a high degree of purity. These have the ability to act as specific ligands for the proteins of interest that are needed when the fusion of proteins to polypeptide tags is impossible or carries no advantage, and thus build affinity columns as is the case in the production of biopharmaceuticals. They were immobilized on an agarose matrix and the columns had a high degree of selectivity.

In addition to this, antibodies and non-immunoglobin proteins can be purified by using affitins via affinity chromatography. Due to their small size and high solubility, they can be easily produced in large amounts using bacterial expression systems.

== Properties ==
Affitins consist of 66 amino acids and have a molecular mass of about 7 kDa; this is small compared to antibodies with some 130–150 kDa. Obtained from a thermophile organism, they are unusually heat resistant proteins. In addition, Affitins are durable – they are able to withstand many cycles of purification. Unlike antibodies, affitins are produced in vitro, and therefore can be generated more quickly. Due to their small size and high solubility, they can easily be produced in large amounts using bacterial expression systems.

Affitins are strongly modified reagents that are extremophilic since they are found in Archae like Sac7d, which is a hyperthermostable protein. They are artificially binding proteins with high affinity, small size, and low structural complexity. They have two different modes of binding. The first requires a flat surface whereas the second mode of binding requires a flat surface and two short loops. They are thermally and chemically stable reagents and their stability can be further increased by using mutation or grafting techniques. Other methods of stabilizing them include the use of sequence elements from other proteins that belong to the same family, switching a binding surface, and thus, have longer binding capacities. This was done by grafting the binding surface of D1Sac7d onto Sso7d, which is more stable, and by introducing point mutations previously identified as stabilizing for WT Sso7d.
