= Cystatin-D =

Protein-coding gene in humans

An Error has occurred retrieving Wikidata item for infobox Cystatin-D is a protein that in humans is encoded by the CST5 gene.

The cystatin superfamily encompasses proteins that contain multiple cystatin-like sequences. Some of the members are active cysteine protease inhibitors, while others have lost or perhaps never acquired this inhibitory activity. There are three inhibitory families in the superfamily, including the type 1 cystatins (stefins), type 2 cystatins and the kininogens. The type 2 cystatin proteins are a class of cysteine proteinase inhibitors found in a variety of human fluids and secretions. The cystatin locus on chromosome 20 contains the majority of the type 2 cystatin genes and pseudogenes. This gene is located in the cystatin locus and encodes a protein found in saliva and tears. The encoded protein may play a protective role against proteinases present in the oral cavity.
