= Pegdinetanib =

Chemical compound

Clinical data
- Trade names: Angiocept
- Other names: CT-322; BMS-844203
- Routes of administration: Intravenous
- ATC code: None

Legal status
- Legal status: Investigational

Identifiers
- CAS Number: 906450-24-6
- ChemSpider: none
- UNII: SSB56T0M0L
- KEGG: D09945

Chemical and physical data
- Formula: C_{468}H_{729}N_{125}O_{139}S (un-PEGylated peptide)
- Molar mass: 10362.78 g·mol^{−1}

Pegdinetanib (USAN; planned trade name Angiocept) is an investigational anti-cancer drug that acts as a selective antagonist of vascular endothelial growth factor receptor 2 (VEGFR-2), hindering vascularization of tumors. It is a genetically engineered peptide derivative based on the monobody technology, and is being developed by Adnexus.

The drug has entered Phase II clinical trials investigating the treatment of glioblastoma in October 2007. As of August 2012, it is also in Phase II trials for the treatment of non-small cell lung cancer and colorectal cancer.

== Chemical structure ==
Pegdinetanib is a peptide consisting of 94 amino acids, with cysteine number 93 carrying a doubly methoxy-PEGylated maleimide derivative with a molecular mass of 40 kDa.
