= Monobody =

Synthetic binding proteins

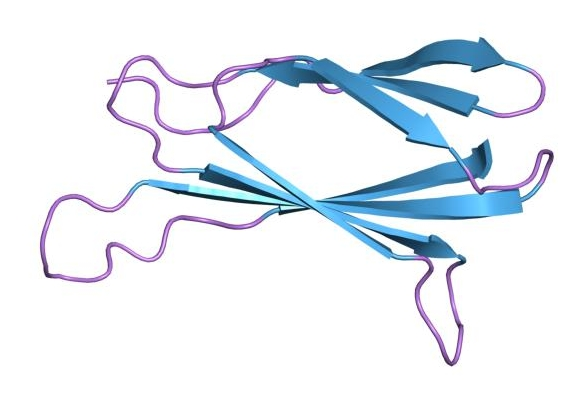
The tenth fibronectin type III domain (human, PDB: 1TTG)

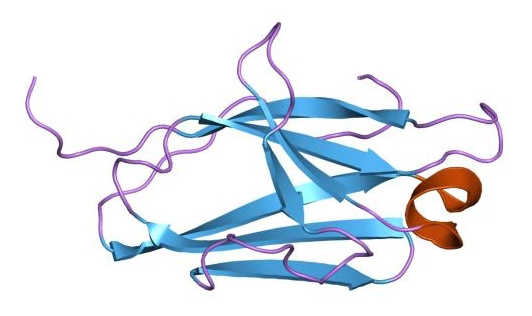
Variable domain of an antibody's lambda light chain (human, PDB: 2RHE)

Monobodies are synthetic binding proteins constructed using a fibronectin type III domain (FN3) as a molecular scaffold. Specifically, this class of binding proteins are built upon a diversified library of the 10th FN3 domain of human fibronectin. Monobodies are a simple and robust alternative to antibodies for creating target-binding proteins. The hybrid term monobody was coined in 1998 by the Koide group who published the first paper demonstrating the monobody concept using the tenth FN3 domain of human fibronectin.

Monobodies are generated from combinatorial libraries in which portions of the FN3 scaffold are diversified using molecular display and directed evolution technologies such as phage display, mRNA display and yeast surface display. A large number of monobodies that have high affinity and high specificity to their respective targets have been reported.

Monobodies belong to the class of molecules collectively called antibody mimics (or antibody mimetics) and alternative scaffolds that aim to overcome shortcomings of natural antibody molecules. A major advantage of monobodies over conventional antibodies is that monobodies can readily be used as genetically encoded intracellular inhibitors, that is you can express a monobody inhibitor in a cell of choice by simply transfecting the cell with a monobody expression vector. This is because of the characteristics of the underlying FN3 scaffold: small (~90 residues), stable, easy to produce, and its lack of disulfide bonds that makes it possible to produce functional monobodies regardless of the redox potential of the cellular environment, including the reducing environment of the cytoplasm and nucleus. In contrast, most antibodies and antibody fragments depend on disulfide bonds formation and they must be produced under an oxidizing environment.

The monobody technology has been adopted in the biotechnology industry, most notably by Adnexus, a biotechnology company which has been part of Bristol-Myers Squibb since 2007 under the name of Adnectins (originally as Trinectins by its predecessor, Phylos). An example is pegdinetanib (Angiocept), an antagonist of vascular endothelial growth factor receptor 2 (VEGFR-2), which has entered Phase II clinical trials investigating the treatment of glioblastoma in October 2007.

== Structure ==
The native FN3 scaffold consists of 94 amino acids and has a molecular mass of about 10 kDa, fifteen times smaller than an IgG type antibody and comparable to the size of a single variable domain of an antibody. They are based on the structure of human fibronectin, more specifically on its tenth extracellular type III domain. This domain has a structure similar to antibody variable domains, with seven beta sheets forming a beta-sandwich and three exposed loops on each side corresponding to the three complementarity-determining regions. Monobodies lack binding sites for metal ions and the central disulfide bond.

== Monobody library designs ==
Monobodies with high affinity and specificity for different target molecules can be generated from combinatorial libraries in which portions of the FN3 scaffold are diversified. There are two distinct designs of monobody libraries that have been successful. The first type modifies some or all of the loops BC (between the second and third beta sheets), DE (between the fourth and fifth beta sheets) and FG (between the sixth and seventh sheets). This design creates diversified positions on a convex surface that is suitable for targeting concave surfaces such as enzyme active sites. The second type modifies positions in some or all of the C, D, F and G (or the 3rd, 4th, 6th and 7th) strands in addition to the CD and FG loops. This design creates a flatter, slightly concave surface that is suitable for targeting surfaces typically involved in protein-protein interactions.

== See also ==
- Single-domain antibody
