= Immune repertoire =

The immune repertoire encompasses the different sub-types an organism's immune system makes of immunoglobulins or T-cell receptors. These help recognise pathogens in most vertebrates. The sub-types, all differing slightly from each other, can amount to tens of thousands, or millions in a given organism. Such a wide variety increases the odds of having a sub-type that recognises one of the many pathogens an organism may encounter. Too few sub-types and the pathogen can avoid the immune system, unchallenged, leading to disease.

== Development ==
Lymphocytes generate the immune repertoire by recombining the genes encoding immunoglobulins and T cell receptors through V(D)J recombination. Although there are only a few of these genes, all their possible combinations can result in a wide variety of immune repertoire proteins. Through selection, cells with autoreactive proteins (and thus may cause autoimmunity) are removed, while cells that may actually detect an invading organism are kept. The immune repertoire is affected by several factors:

- Age: as the immune system develops over life, lymphocytes generate their own unique gene sequences. Developed cells eventually die, but may not be replaced by new subtypes.
- Exposure to diseases triggers further development of the immune repertoire, and thus fine-tunes the immune response. Memory B cells and memory T cells ensure the persistence of the immune repertoire after a disease has passed.
- Genetic diseases (primary immunodeficiency may impede the creation and development of immune repertoire proteins).
- Treatments affecting the immune system e.g. hematopoietic stem cell transplantation, where the immune repertoire has to be regenerated from scratch.

== Size ==
Due to technical difficulties, measuring the immune repertoire was seldom attempted. Estimates depend on the precise type or 'compartment' of immune cells and the protein studied, but the expected billions of combinations may be an over-estimation. The genetic spatio-temporal rule governing the TCR locus rearrangements imply that V(D)J rearrangements are not random, hence resulting in a smaller V(D)J diversity.

- TCR gamma genes, in CD8^{+}CD45RO^{+} memory T cells in blood: estimates range from 40,000 to 100,000 sub-types in healthy young adults and from 3,600 to 97,000 in healthy old adults.
- TCR alpha and TCR beta in CD4^{+}/CD8^{+} T-cells are estimated at approximately 100,000 sub-types.

== Future developments ==
Next generation sequencing may have a large impact. This can obtain thousands of DNA sequences, from different genes, quickly, at the same time, relatively cheaply. Thus it may be possible, to take a large sample of cells from someones immune system, and look quickly at the range of sub-types present in the sample. The ability to obtain data quickly from tens or hundreds of thousands of cells, one cell at a time, should provide a good idea, of the size of the person's immune repertoire. These large-scale adaptive immune receptor repertoire sequencing (AIRR-seq) data require specialized bioinformatics pipelines to be analyzed effectively. Many computational tools are being developed for this purpose, including:

- The MiXCR is one of the most widely cited platforms for the analysis of high-throughput T cell and B cell receptor sequencing data.
- The Immcantation framework provides a start-to-finish analytical ecosystem for high-throughput AIRR-seq data analysis.
- The Cell Ranger software for the analysis of single-cell sequencing data, including T and B cell receptor data.

The AIRR Community is community-driven organization that is organizing and coordinating stakeholders in the use of next-generation sequencing technologies to study immune repertoires. In 2017, the AIRR Community published recommendations for a minimal set of metadata that should be used to describe an AIRR-seq data set when published and deposited in a public repository.

== See also ==
- Immunosequencing
