= Affimer =

Type of protein

The Affimer protein scaffold – showing the two loops where random peptides can be inserted to create a protein binding surface

Affimer molecules, also known as adhiron, are small proteins that bind to target proteins with affinity in the nanomolar range. These engineered non-antibody binding proteins are designed to mimic the molecular recognition characteristics of monoclonal antibodies in different applications. These affinity reagents have been optimized to increase their stability, make them tolerant to a range of temperatures and pH, reduce their size, and to increase their expression in E.coli and mammalian cells.

== Development ==
Affimer proteins were developed initially at the MRC Cancer Cell Unit in Cambridge then across two laboratories at the University of Leeds. Derived from the cysteine protease inhibitor family of cystatins, which function in nature as cysteine protease inhibitors, these 12–14 kDa proteins share the common tertiary structure of an alpha-helix lying on top of an anti-parallel beta-sheet.

Affimer proteins display two peptide loops that can all be randomized to bind to desired target proteins, in a similar manner to monoclonal antibodies. Stabilization of the two peptides by the protein scaffold constrains the possible conformations that the peptides can take. This increases the binding affinity and specificity compared to libraries of free peptides, though can limit the target repertoire of Affimers.

== Production ==
Phage display libraries of 10^{9} randomized sequences are used to screen for Affimer proteins that exhibit high-specificity binding to the target protein with binding affinities in the nM range. The ability to direct in vitro screening techniques allows the identification of specific, high affinity Affimers. In vitro screening and development also mean that the target space for Affimers is not limited by the animal immune system. Affimers are generated using recombinant systems, so their generation is more rapid and reproducible compared to the production of polyclonal antibodies.

Multimeric forms Affimers have been generated and shown to yield titres in the range of 200–400 mg/L under small-scale culture using bacterial host systems. Multimeric forms of Affimers with the same target specificity provide avidity effects in target binding.

Many different tags and fusion proteins, such as fluorophores, single-stranded DNA, His, and c-Myc tags can be conjugated to Affimers. Specific cysteine residues can be introduced to the protein to allow thiol chemistry to uniformly orient Affimers on a solid support eg ELISA plates. This flexible functionalisation of the Affimer molecule allows functionality across multiple applications and assay formats.

== Properties ==
Affimers are recombinant proteins. As they are manufactured using recombinant bacterial production processes, the batch-to-batch consistency for Affimers is improved compared to polyclonal antibodies, overcoming some of the issues of reproducibility and security of supply.

These synthetic antibodies were engineered to be stable, non-toxic, biologically neutral and contain no post-translational modifications or disulfide bridges. Two separate loop sequences, incorporating a total of 12 to 36 amino acids, form the target interaction surface so interaction surfaces can range form 650–1000 Å. The large interaction surface results allows binding to target proteins.

== Applications ==
Affimer technology has been commercialised and developed by Avacta, which is developing these affinity reagents as tools for diagnostics and as biotherapeutics.

=== Reagents and Diagnostics ===
Affimer binders have been used across a number of platforms, including ELISA, surface plasmon resonance, affinity purification. Affimers that inhibit protein-protein interactions can be produced with the potential to express these inhibitors in mammalian cells modify signalling pathways as cell therapies.

=== Therapeutics ===
The small size and stability profile of Affimers combined with their human origin confer drug-like properties. This may represent advantages over antibodies in terms of tissue penetration, for example in solid tumours where Avacta are developing PD-L1 inhibitors as alternatives to Opdivo and Yervoy, though requires half life modification to prevent rapid excretion through the kidney.

Affimers can be conjugated to form multimers for the design of therapeutics. Examples include the production of multi-specific Affimer molecules to albumin binders to increase their half-life in vivo and for use as the targeting moiety in chimeric receptors or modified to carry a toxin in Affimer-drug conjugates.

Affimers as therapeutics are in discovery and preclinical development to tackle cancer, both via CAR-T cell therapy and as checkpoint inhibitors. Early studies using ex vivo human samples showed low immunogenicity associated with the Affimer scaffold, at levels comparable to a marketed antibody therapeutic. Furthermore, initial preclinical studies showed good efficacy and tolerability of the anti-PDL1 immuno-oncology Affimers in mice. It is anticipated that IND filing for the first Affimer therapeutic will occur in 2023.
