= 7 kDa DNA-binding protein =

7kD DNA-binding domain

Identifiers
- Symbol: 7kD_DNA_binding
- Pfam: PF02294
- InterPro: IPR003212
- CATH: 1c8c
- SCOP2: 1c8c / SCOPe / SUPFAM
Available protein structures:
- PDB: IPR003212 PF02294 (ECOD; PDBsum)
- AlphaFold: IPR003212; PF02294

The 7 kDa DNA-binding proteins are a family of DNA-binding proteins from Sulfolobales archaea. These proteins bind DNA in a mostly sequence-independent manner, with some preference for G/C rich regions and affinities that differ from each other. They serve a genome-packaing purpose analogous to histones. They are resistant to high temperatures as well as low and high pH.

== Biology ==
The 7kDa proteins are universally found in Sulfolobus, where two copies (Sul7d, Sul7e) are present as separate genes. The proteins are usually named after the species, e.g. Sso7d for the 7d of S. solfataricus and Sac7e for the 7e of S. acidocaldarius. Sul7a and Sul7b are truncated versions of 7d. "Sso7c" does not appear to be a member of this family. S. tokodaii is unusual in that the two copies only differ by one nucleotide and produce the same protein, so its version is simply called Sto7.

Across Sulfolobales, Acidianus, Metallosphaera, and "Candidatus Aramenus" also encode a 7kDa DNA-binding protein, named according to the genus name or the species name in an analogous fashion. Each genome may carry anywhere from 1 to 3 versions of the protein.

== Biotechnology ==
The 7kDa proteins are valuable tools in biotechnology due to their ability to bind any dsDNA. When grafted onto a DNA polymerase, it greatly enhances the processivity of the enzyme by helping it stay bound to the DNA. Using such a modified enzyme allows a polymerase chain reaction to copy much longer pieces of DNA at a faster rate. Such fusion polymerases are sold under various tradenames under premium prices since 2014, but they can also be made and purified in a lab. (The commercial versions include additional mutations for performance.)

The 7kDa protein scaffold is also a good starting point for artificial affinity proteins (affitins) that can be used to bind any molecule of interest. Techniques such as phage display are used to screen a wide variety of mutants and select for the good binders. Compared to antibodies, they are much smaller and much stabler.
