= Cystatin-M =

Protein-coding gene in humans

CST6

Identifiers
- Aliases: CST6, cystatin E/M, ECTD15
- External IDs: OMIM: 601891; MGI: 1920970; GeneCards: CST6
Available structures
PDB	Ortholog search: PDBe RCSB
PDB	List of PDB id codes 4N6L, 4N6M, 4N6N, 4N6O

Gene location (Human)
Chr.	Chromosome 11 (human)
Band	11q13.1	Start	66,012,008 bp
Band	11q13.1	End	66,013,505 bp

Gene location (Mouse)
Chr.	Chromosome 19 (mouse)
Band	19 A|19 4.3 cM	Start	5,394,733 bp
Band	19 A|19 4.3 cM	End	5,399,602 bp
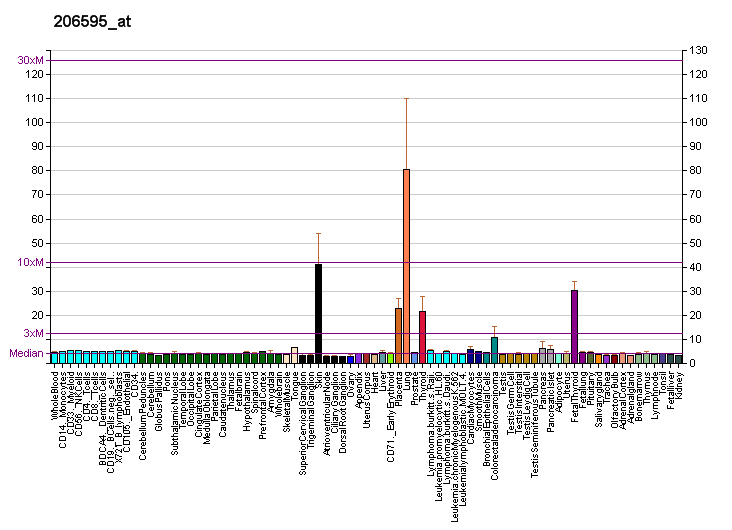
RNA expression pattern
Bgee	Human / Mouse (ortholog); Top expressed in: skin of arm; skin of thigh; skin of abdomen; vulva; nipple; skin of hip; hair follicle; right uterine tube; Descending thoracic aorta; human penis / Top expressed in: lip; skin of external ear; esophagus; skin of back; duodenum; ileum; muscle of thigh; intestinal villus; jejunum; lumbar spinal ganglion; More reference expression data
BioGPS	More reference expression data
Gene ontology
Molecular function	peptidase inhibitor activity; protease binding; cysteine-type endopeptidase inhibitor activity
Cellular component	extracellular region; extracellular exosome; cornified envelope; extracellular space
Biological process	anatomical structure morphogenesis; negative regulation of peptidase activity; epidermis development; negative regulation of cysteine-type endopeptidase activity; negative regulation of endopeptidase activity
Sources:Amigo / QuickGO
Orthologs
Databases	NCBI: entry; OMA: entry
Species	Human	Mouse
Entrez	1474	73720
Ensembl	ENSG00000175315	ENSMUSG00000024846
UniProt	Q15828	Q9D1B1
RefSeq (mRNA)	NM_001323	NM_028623
RefSeq (protein)	NP_001314	NP_082899
Location (UCSC)	Chr 11: 66.01 – 66.01 Mb	Chr 19: 5.39 – 5.4 Mb
PubMed search
- Wikidata
View/Edit Human	View/Edit Mouse

Cystatin-M is a protein that in humans is encoded by the CST6 gene.

The cystatin superfamily encompasses proteins that contain multiple cystatin-like sequences. Some of the members are active cysteine protease inhibitors, while others have lost or perhaps never acquired this inhibitory activity. There are three inhibitory families in the superfamily, including the type 1 cystatins (stefins), type 2 cystatins and the kininogens. The type 2 cystatin proteins are a class of cysteine proteinase inhibitors found in a variety of human fluids and secretions, where they appear to provide protective functions. This gene encodes a cystatin from the type 2 family, which is down-regulated in metastatic breast tumor cells as compared to primary tumor cells. Loss of expression is likely associated with the progression of a primary tumor to a metastatic phenotype.
