= CRYGB =

Protein-coding gene in humans

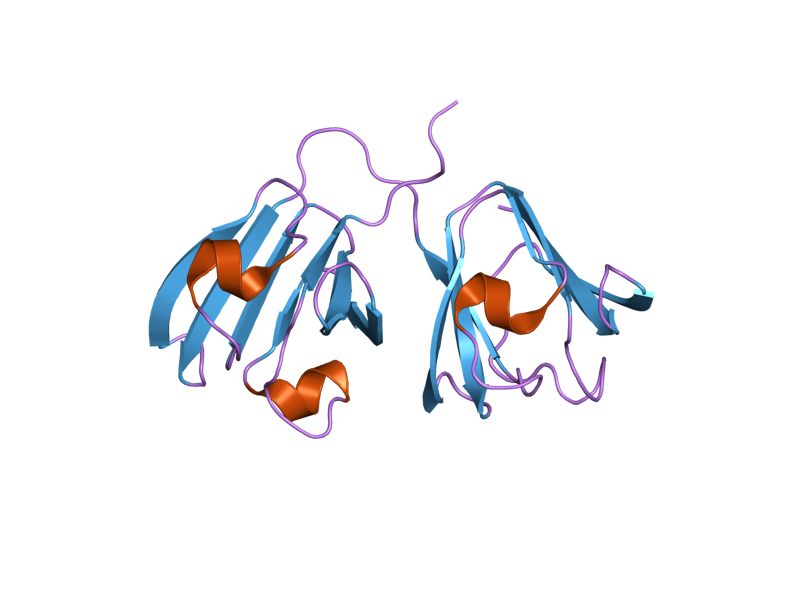

Identifiers
- Aliases: CRYGB, CRYG2, CTRCT39, crystallin gamma B
- External IDs: OMIM: 123670; MGI: 88522; GeneCards: CRYGB
Available structures
PDB	Ortholog search: PDBe RCSB
PDB	List of PDB id codes 2JDF, 2JDG

Gene location (Human)
Chr.	Chromosome 2 (human)
Band	2q33.3	Start	208,142,573 bp
Band	2q33.3	End	208,146,158 bp

Gene location (Mouse)
Chr.	Chromosome 1 (mouse)
Band	1 C2|1 32.82 cM	Start	65,119,378 bp
Band	1 C2|1 32.82 cM	End	65,121,447 bp
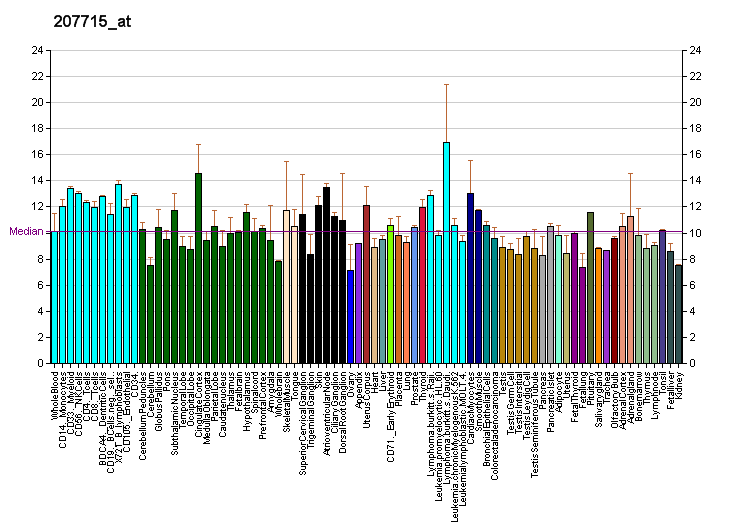
RNA expression pattern
Bgee	Human / Mouse (ortholog); Top expressed in: testicle; substantia nigra; C1 segment; hippocampal formation; mucosa of nose; hypothalamus; prefrontal cortex; temporal lobe; hippocampus proper; endometrium / Top expressed in: lens; epithelium of lens; corneal stroma; retinal pigment epithelium; conjunctival fornix; ciliary body; embryo; iris; human fetus; blastocyst; More reference expression data
BioGPS	More reference expression data
Gene ontology
Molecular function	structural constituent of eye lens
Cellular component	nucleus; cytoplasm; cellular component
Biological process	lens fiber cell morphogenesis; eye development; visual perception; lens fiber cell development; lens development in camera-type eye
Sources:Amigo / QuickGO
Orthologs
Databases	NCBI: entry; OMA: entry
Species	Human	Mouse
Entrez	1419	12965
Ensembl	ENSG00000182187	ENSMUSG00000073658
UniProt	P07316	P04344
RefSeq (mRNA)	NM_005210	NM_144761
RefSeq (protein)	NP_005201	NP_658906
Location (UCSC)	Chr 2: 208.14 – 208.15 Mb	Chr 1: 65.12 – 65.12 Mb
PubMed search
- Wikidata
View/Edit Human	View/Edit Mouse

Gamma-crystallin B is a protein that in humans is encoded by the CRYGB gene.

Crystallins are separated into two classes: taxon-specific, or enzyme, and ubiquitous. The latter class constitutes the major proteins of vertebrate eye lens and maintains the transparency and refractive index of the lens. Since lens central fiber cells lose their nuclei during development, these crystallins are made and then retained throughout life, making them extremely stable proteins.

Mammalian lens crystallins are divided into alpha, beta, and gamma families; beta and gamma crystallins are also considered as a superfamily. Alpha and beta families are further divided into acidic and basic groups. Seven protein regions exist in crystallins: four homologous motifs, a connecting peptide, and N- and C-terminal extensions.

Gamma-crystallins are a homogeneous group of highly symmetrical, monomeric proteins typically lacking connecting peptides and terminal extensions. They are differentially regulated after early development. Four gamma-crystallin genes (gamma-A through gamma-D) and three pseudogenes (gamma-E, gamma-F, gamma-G) are tandemly organized in a genomic segment as a gene cluster. Whether due to aging or mutations in specific genes, gamma-crystallins have been involved in cataract formation.
