= Target protein =

Target proteins are functional biomolecules that are addressed and controlled by biologically active compounds. They are used in the processes of transduction, transformation and conjugation. The identification of target proteins, the investigation of signal transduction processes and the understanding of their interaction with ligands are key elements of modern biomedical research. Since the interaction with target proteins is the molecular origin of most drugs, their particular importance for molecular biology, molecular pharmacy and pharmaceutical sciences is obvious. Target proteins control the action and the kinetic behavior of drugs within the organism. The elucidation of structure, conformational signaling and catalytic properties of particular target proteins facilitates a rational design of drugs and biotechnological processes. Known as biologicals, target proteins can also be drugs by themselves when their modification and formulation is emphasized within the pharmaceutical sciences. Finally, target protein - inducer interactions can be exploited for biomolecular transcription regulating systems in order to control for example gene therapeutic approaches.

== See also ==
- Biological target
