= Russell J. Howard =

Australian scientist and businessman

- Born: 30 August 1950 (age 75); Australia
- Citizenship: Australia
- Education: University of Melbourne
- Known for: Malaria research, biotechnology industry
- Awards: Advance Global Australian Award, Overall winner and Biotechnology Award (2013); Grimwade Medal (2016)
- Scientific career
- Fields: Biotechnology
- Workplaces: WEHI, NIH, DNAX, Affymax, Maxygen, NovoNutrients, NeuClone, Immutep, Garvan Institute of Medical Research, Theia Metals

Russell John Howard (born 30 August 1950) is an Australian scientist, biotechnology executive and company director. His research contributed to the molecular understanding of malaria, including the characterisation of Plasmodium falciparum histidine-rich proteins and work leading to the first molecular cloning of PfEMP1, a major variant antigen on malaria-infected red blood cells. He subsequently led biotechnology companies working in directed evolution, industrial biotechnology, biosimilar medicines and immuno-oncology.

== Education and malaria research ==
Howard studied biochemistry at the University of Melbourne, where he completed a BSc (Hons) and a PhD. His doctoral research examined photosynthetic metabolism in the marine alga Caulerpa simpliciuscula. After postdoctoral research at the Walter and Eliza Hall Institute of Medical Research, he joined the National Institute of Allergy and Infectious Diseases at the US National Institutes of Health, where he became a tenured principal investigator. He later continued malaria research at the DNAX Research Institute and Affymax Research Institute in California.

His malaria work encompassed experimental infection models, cultured parasites, protein immunochemistry and molecular biology, as well as studies using blood samples obtained from patients in West Africa.

An important experimental bridge was Howard's work with John W. Barnwell, Louis H. Miller and colleagues on schizont-infected cell agglutination (SICA) antigens in Plasmodium knowlesi infections of rhesus monkeys. These studies identified clone-specific, high-molecular-weight variant proteins on the surface of infected erythrocytes and showed that their expression was influenced by the spleen. The SICA work established experimental approaches for investigating malaria antigenic variation that were subsequently applied to P. falciparum-infected human erythrocytes, leading through successive protein, immunochemical and molecular studies to the characterisation and cloning of PfEMP1.

Research with Kevin Marsh showed that children recovering from P. falciparum malaria developed antibodies that recognised the surface of red blood cells infected with the particular parasite isolate responsible for their illness, whereas sera from immune adults reacted with a broader range of isolates.

Howard and colleagues characterised two related histidine-rich parasite proteins, subsequently termed PfHRP2 and PfHRP3. PfHRP2 is released into the blood during infection and became the target of widely deployed rapid diagnostic tests for falciparum malaria, enabling parasite-based diagnosis where microscopy is unavailable or impractical. The World Health Organization reported that 2.7 billion malaria rapid diagnostic tests were sold between 2010 and 2019, with the majority distributed in sub-Saharan Africa to diagnose P. falciparum infection by detecting HRP2.

His group also studied the high-molecular-weight variant antigens displayed on infected erythrocytes. This research established relationships among antigenic variation, surface exposure and cytoadherence, and culminated in the cloning of a gene encoding PfEMP1. PfEMP1 is expressed on the surface of infected erythrocytes and mediates their adhesion to host receptors, contributing to sequestration in small blood vessels, immune evasion and severe malaria.

== Biotechnology career ==
Howard joined Affymax Research Institute in 1992 and became its president and scientific director in 1994. After Affymax was acquired by Glaxo Wellcome, he participated in the development and commercialisation of DNA shuffling, also known as molecular breeding, a directed evolution method developed by Willem P. C. Stemmer.

In 1997 Howard became president and chief operating officer of Maxygen, a company spun out of Affymax, and became chief executive officer and a director in 1998. Maxygen applied directed evolution to pharmaceutical, agricultural and industrial products. The company completed its initial public offering on Nasdaq in December 1999 and a follow-on offering in March 2000, raising more than US$230 million in total. Businesses originating from Maxygen included Codexis, which developed engineered enzymes for pharmaceutical and industrial applications, and Verdia, an agricultural biotechnology subsidiary later acquired by DuPont.

After leaving Maxygen, Howard co-founded Oakbio, later renamed NovoNutrients. The company developed gas-fermentation processes intended to convert carbon dioxide-rich industrial gases into microbial protein and other products. Howard served as a co-founder and chair. In 2026, US biomanufacturing company Biosphere acquired NovoNutrients' intellectual property, microbial strains and process expertise, incorporating the assets into its gas-fermentation platform.

Howard returned to Australia and joined the Sydney biotechnology company NeuClone as executive chairman in January 2013. NeuClone developed biosimilar monoclonal antibodies in partnership with the Serum Institute of India. Proposed biosimilars of trastuzumab and ustekinumab subsequently completed Phase I studies in Australia.

From 2015 to 2018, Howard advised the Garvan Institute of Medical Research's Kinghorn Centre for Clinical Genomics and served as head of commercial strategy for Genome.One. Genome.One was established by Garvan to provide clinical whole-genome sequencing and interpretation services.

Howard joined the board of Prima BioMed as a non-executive director in May 2013. Prima acquired the French biotechnology company Immutep S.A. in 2014, gaining a portfolio of therapies based on the LAG-3 immune-control pathway, and adopted the Immutep name in 2017. Howard was appointed non-executive chairman in November 2017. Immutep subsequently advanced eftilagimod alfa into clinical trials in several cancers. Its Phase III TACTI-004 trial in first-line non-small-cell lung cancer was discontinued in March 2026 following a planned interim futility analysis; the company continued to assess the broader development programme.

In 2025 Howard co-founded Theia Metals with B. Sara Howard and became its chair and chief executive officer. In collaboration with researchers led by Chun-Xia Zhao at Adelaide University, the company is developing biomolecule-based methods for recovering and separating rare-earth elements from mineral-processing streams.

== Appointments and recognition ==
Howard served as the biotechnology industry representative on the board of the University of Queensland's Institute for Molecular Bioscience from 2000 to 2004. He has also held board roles with Australian biotechnology companies including Circadian Technologies, Prima BioMed and Immutep.

He received honorary Doctor of Science degrees from the University of Technology Sydney in 2004, the University of Queensland in 2008 and the University of Melbourne in 2014. In 2013 he received both the Biotechnology category award and the overall Advance Global Australian Award. He was the inaugural recipient of the University of Melbourne's Grimwade Medal for Biochemistry in 2016.

Institutional biographies credit Howard with more than 140 peer-reviewed scientific publications and several issued patents.
