= Display =

Display may refer to:

== Technology ==
- Display device, output device for presenting information, including:
  - Electronic visual display, output device to present information for visual or tactile reception
    - Cathode-ray tube (CRT), that uses an electromagnetically deviated electron beam to scan and stimulate a phosphorescent screen; the earliest and once the dominant type of electronic display, but is very large and heavy for the screen size, and thus completely obsolete at the early 21st century
    - Flat-panel display (FPD), video display that is much lighter and thinner than deeper, usually older types
      - Liquid-crystal display (LCD), displays that use liquid crystals to form images
        - Liquid crystal display television (LCD TV), color TVs that use an LCD to form images
      - Plasma display, that uses small plasma cells that responds to electric fields to generate colored images.
      - Light-emitting diode (LED), emitting light when electrically charged, producing electroluminescence
    - Stereo display, a display device able to convey image depth to a viewer
      - Volumetric display, forms a visual representation of an object in three physical dimensions
  - Video projector, an image projector that projects a video image onto a reflective projection screen.
    - Rear projection, a type of large-screen display technology that uses a bottom-mounted CRT projector to reflect an image off an angled screen.
  - Refreshable braille display, electromechanical device to display braille characters
  - Split-flap display, electromechanical alphanumeric device, often used as a public transport timetable in airports or railway stations
  - Flip-disc display, electromechanical dot matrix technology used for large outdoor signs
- Video card, also known as "display card", an expansion card that generates images to display device
- Display list, series of graphics commands that define an output image
- Display register or data structure, for locating the stack frames of nested functions in computer programming
- Display resolution, refers to the number of distinct pixels of a digital TV or monitor
- Display (social network), a now-defunct social network

== Marketing ==
- Display advertising, type that typically contains text, i.e., copy, logos, images, location maps, etc.
- Display case, also termed a showcase or display cabinet, used to display objects for viewing
- Display window, usually in a shop to display items for sale or attract customers
- Point of sale display, material object for promotion and/or providing information, i.e., in a shop or movie theater for a film promotion, etc.
- Trade show display, the physical screens, banners and other paraphernalia used to fill a temporary exhibit space at a trade fair

== Biology ==
- Display (zoology), a form of animal behaviour
- Display (horse) (1923–1944), US thoroughbred racehorse
- Display techniques in biochemistry:
  - Bacterial display
  - mRNA display
  - Phage display
  - Ribosome display
  - Yeast display

== See also ==
- Computer font or display font, for use on a computer monitor
- Computer monitor or display
- Display font, for use in eye-catching elements at large sizes
