= In vitro compartmentalization =

In vitro compartmentalization (IVC) is an emulsion-based technology that generates cell-like compartments in vitro. These compartments are designed such that each contains no more than one gene. When the gene is transcribed and/or translated, its products (RNAs and/or proteins) become 'trapped' with the encoding gene inside the compartment. By coupling the genotype (DNA) and phenotype (RNA, protein), compartmentalization allows the selection and evolution of phenotype.

== History ==
In vitro compartmentalization method was first developed by Dan Tawfik and Andrew Griffiths. Based on the idea that Darwinian evolution relies on the linkage of genotype to phenotype, Tawfik and Griffiths designed aqueous compartments of water-in-oil (w/o) emulsions to mimic cellular compartments that can link genotype and phenotype. Emulsions of cell-like compartments were formed by adding in vitro transcription/translation reaction mixture to stirred mineral oil containing surfactants. The mean droplet diameter was measured to be 2.6 μm by laser diffraction. As a proof of concept, Tawfik and Griffiths designed a selection experiment using a pool of DNA sequences, including the gene encoding HaeIII DNA methyltransferase (M.HaeIII) in the presence of 10^{7}-fold excess of genes encoding a different enzyme folA. The 3’ of each DNA sequences was purposely designed to contain a HaeIII recognition site which, in the presence of expressed methyltransferase, would be methylated and, thus, resistant to restriction enzyme digestion. By selecting for DNA sequences that survive the endonuclease digestion, Tawfik and Griffiths found that the M.HaeIII genes were enriched by at least 1000-fold over the folA genes within the first round of selection.

== Method ==
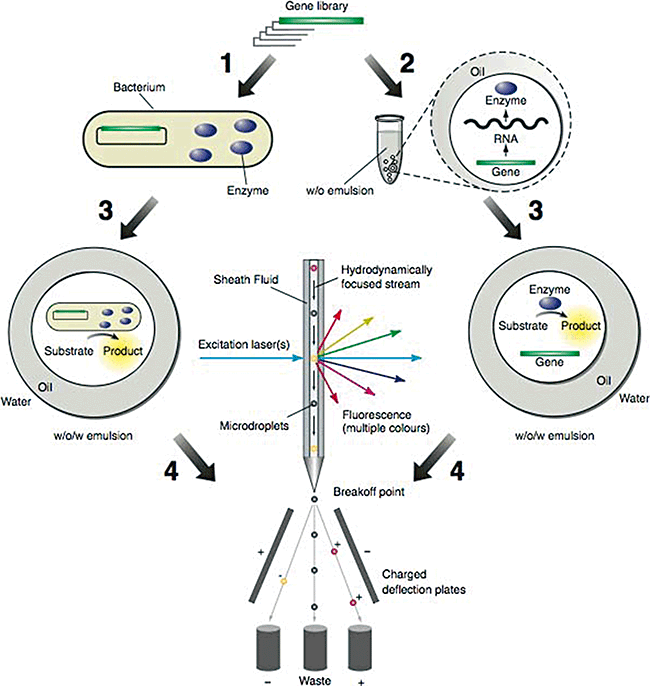
Comparison of in vivo cell compartmentalisation (left) versus in vitro compartmentalization (right) using double emulsion droplets and fluorescent sorting. 1) In an in vivo system, a library of genes is transformed into bacteria to produce the protein variants and dispersed into a water‐in‐oil (w/o) emulsion aiming to have each droplet contain maximum one cell. 2) In an in vitro system, no cells are used and instead protein variants are produced via in vitro transcription/translation aiming to have one gene per droplet. 3,4) In both cases, droplets are then resuspended in water to make a water‐in‐oil‐in‐water (w/o/w) emulsion, have a fluorogenic substrate added, and passed in front of the laser and detector in a fluorescence activated cell sorter. This causes genes that encode active protein variants to be isolated and amplified, sequenced and used for further rounds of selection or directed evolution.

=== Emulsion technology ===
Water-in-oil (w/o) emulsions are created by mixing aqueous and oil phases with the help of surfactants. A typical IVC emulsion is formed by first generating oil-surfactant mixture by stirring, and then gradually adding the aqueous phase to the oil-surfactant mixture. For stable emulsion formation, a mixture of HLB (hydrophile-lipophile balance) and low HLB surfactants are needed. Some combinations of surfactants used to generate oil-surfactant mixture are mineral oil / 0.5% Tween 80 / 4.5% Span 80 / sodium deoxycholate and a more heat stable version, light mineral oil / 0.4% Tween 80 / 4.5% Span 80 / 0.05% Triton X-100. The aqueous phase containing transcription and/or translation components is slowly added to the oil surfactants, and the formation of w/o is facilitated by homogenizing, stirring or using hand extruding device.

The emulsion quality can be determined by light microscopy and/or dynamic light scattering techniques. The emulsion is quite diverse, and greater homogenization speeds helps to produce smaller droplets with narrower size distribution. However, homogenization speeds has to be controlled, since speed over 13,500 r.p.m tends to result in a significant loss of enzyme activity on the level of transcription. The most widely used emulsion formation gives droplets with a mean diameter of 2-3μm, and an average volume of ~5 femtoliters, or 10^{10} aqueous droplet per ml of emulsions. The ratio of genes to droplets is designed such that most of the droplets contains no more than a single gene statistically.

=== In vitro transcription/translation ===
IVC enables the miniaturization of large-scale techniques that can now be done on the micro scale including coupled in vitro transcription and translation (IVTT) experiments. Streamlining and integrating transcription and translation allows for fast and highly controllable experimental designs. IVTT can be done both in bulk emulsions and in microdroplets by utilizing droplet-based microfluidics. Microdroplets, droplets on the scale of pico to femtoliters, have been successfully used as single DNA molecule vessels. This droplet technology allows high throughput analysis with many different selection pressures in a single experimental setup. IVTT in microdroplets is preferred when overexpression of a desired protein would be toxic to a host cell minimizing the utility of the transcription and translation mechanisms.

IVC has used bacterial cell, wheat germ and rabbit reticulocyte (RRL) extracts for transcription and translation. It is also possible to use bacterial reconstituted translation system such as PURE in which translation components are individually purified and later combined. When expressing eukaryote or complex proteins, it is desirable to use eukaryotic translation systems such as wheat germ extract or more superior alternative, RRL extract. In order to use RRL for transcription and translation, traditional emulsion formulation cannot be used as it abolishes translation. Instead, a novel emulsion formulation: 4% Abil EM90 / light mineral oil was developed and demonstrated to be functional in expressing luciferase and human telomerase.

=== Breaking emulsion and coupling of genotype and phenotype ===
Once transcription and/or translation has completed in the droplets, emulsion will be broken by successive steps of removing mineral oil and surfactants to allow for subsequent selection. At this stage, it is crucial to have a method to ‘track’ each gene products to the encoding gene as they become free floating in a heterogeneous population of molecules. There are three major approaches to track down each phenotype to its genotype. The first method is to attach each DNA molecule with a biotin group and an additional coding sequence for streptavidin (STABLE display). All the newly formed proteins/peptides will be in fusion with streptavidin molecules and bind to their biotinylated coding sequence. An improved version attached two biotin molecules to the ends of a DNA molecule to increase the avidity between DNA molecule and streptavidin-fused peptides, and used a low GC content synthetic streptavidin gene to increase efficiency and specificity during PCR amplification. The second method is to covalently link DNA and protein. Two strategies have been demonstrated. The first is to form M.HaeIII fusion proteins. Each expressed protein/polypeptide will be in fusion with Hae III DNA methyltransferase domain, which is able to bind covalently to DNA fragments containing the sequence 5′-GGC*-3′, where C* is 5-fluoro-2 deoxycytidine. The second strategy is to use monomeric mutant of VirD2 enzyme. When a protein/peptide is expressed in fusion with Agrobacterium protein VirD2, it will bind to its DNA coding sequence that has a single-stranded overhang comprising VirD2 T-border recognition sequences. The third method is to link phenotype and genotype via beads. The beads used will be coated with streptavidin to allow for the binding of biotinylated DNA, in addition, the beads will also display cognate binding partner to the affinity tag that will be expressed in fusion with the protein/peptide.

== Selection ==
Depending on the phenotype to be selected, difference selection strategies will be used. Selection strategy can be divided into three major categories: selection for binding, selection for catalysis and selection for regulation. The phenotype to be selected can range from RNA to peptide to protein. By selecting for binding, the most commonly evolved phenotypes are peptide/proteins that have selective affinity to a specific antibody or DNA molecule. An example is the selection of proteins that have affinity to zinc finger DNA by Sepp et al. By selecting for catalytic proteins/RNAs, new variants with novel or improved enzymatic property are usually isolated. For example, new ribozyme variants with trans-ligase activity were selected and exhibited multiple turnovers. By selecting for regulation, inhibitors of DNA nucleases can be selected, such as protein inhibitors of the Colicin E7 DNase.

== Advantages ==
Comparing to other in vitro display technologies, IVC has two major advantages. The first advantage is its ability to control reactions within the droplets. Hydrophobic and hydrophilic components can be delivered to each droplet in a step-wise fashion without compromising the chemical integrity of the droplet, and thus by controlling what to be added and when to be added, the reaction in each droplet is controlled. In addition, depending on the nature of the reaction to be carried out, the pH of each droplet can also be changed. More recently, photocaged substrates were used and their participation in a reaction was regulated by photo-activation. The second advantage is that IVC allows the selection of catalytic molecules. As an example, Griffiths et al. was able to select for phosphotriesterase variants with higher K_{cat} by detecting product formation and amount using anti-product antibody and flow cytometry respectively.

== Related technologies ==
- CIS display
- Phage display
- Bacterial display
- Yeast display
- Ribosome display
- mRNA display
