= Dan Tawfik =

Israeli biochemist (1955–2021)

Dan S. Tawfik
- דן תופיק
- Born: Dan Salah Tawfik; 28 May 1955; Jerusalem, Israel
- Died: 4 May 2021 (aged 65); Paklenica, Croatia
- Known for: enzyme promiscuity; directed evolution; in vitro compartmentalization; evolvability; protein engineering
- Awards: Weizmann Prize (2007); EMBO Membership (2009); Teva Award for Excellence in Memory of Eli Hurvitz (2013); The ECI Enzyme Engineering Award (2015); EMET Prize in Life Sciences (2020); Gordon Hammes ACS Lectureship (2021)
- Scientific career
- Fields: Biochemistry; Evolution; Molecular biology
- Workplaces: Weizmann Institute of Science
- Doctoral advisor: Profs. Zelig Eshhar and Michael Sela

Dan Salah Tawfik (Hebrew: דן תופיק; 28 May 1955 – 4 May 2021) was an Israeli biochemist, best known for his contributions in protein engineering, evolutionary biochemistry and, more particularly, enzyme evolution.

== Biography ==
Tawfik was born in Jerusalem to a family of Jewish immigrants originally from Iraq. He received his BSc in chemistry and biochemistry (1988) and MSc in biotechnology (1990) from the Hebrew University in Jerusalem, and his PhD from the Weizmann Institute of Science (1995). He then moved to the United Kingdom where, after two years of postdoctoral research working under Alan Fersht at the University of Cambridge (UK) and at the Medical Research Council (MRC) Centre for Protein Engineering, he became a senior research fellow at Sidney Sussex College and at the Centre for Protein Engineering, where he was appointed group leader in 1999. In 2001 he joined the Department of Biological Chemistry (now called the Department of Biomolecular Sciences) at the Weizmann Institute of Science and held the Nella and Leon Benoziyo Professorial Chair of Biochemistry from 2010. Tawfik was Vice-Chair of the Scientific Council of the Weizmann Institute of Science from 2019 until the time of his death.

Tawfik died on 4 May 2021, in a rock climbing accident at Anića kuk in Paklenica National Park, Croatia.

== Research ==
Tawfik developed in vitro compartmentalization (jointly with Andrew D. Griffiths). This technology enables the compartmentalization of single DNA/RNA molecules in emulsion droplets, thus providing cell-like compartment, in which genes can be replicated, transcribed and translated. This technology allowed directed enzyme evolution to be performed without the involvement of living cells, and also became the basis of massive parallel sequencing methods such as 454 sequencing or SOLID, and of digital polymerase chain reaction.

Tawfik was one of the earliest and most highly-cited contributors to the study of enzyme promiscuity and its role in enzyme evolution. He established the link between the conformational diversity of proteins and their promiscuity, demonstrated the evolvability of promiscuous protein functions (the ability of mutations to dramatically enhance a promiscuous activity with minor effects of the protein's original function), and the role of promiscuity in the evolution of pesticide degrading enzymes. His group has also addressed the evolutionary trajectories that lead to new enzymes, and the link between protein folding, stability and evolvability.

His research on the emergence of the first enzymes worked toward establishing the roots of the most common enzyme lineages, the Rossmann enzymes and P-loop NTPases, in simple polypeptides, suggested ornithine as the first cationic amino acid, and demonstrated the evolvability of promiscuous protein functions (the ability of mutations to dramatically enhance a promiscuous activity with minor effects of the protein's original function).

== Awards and honours ==
- The Wolgin Prize for Scientific Excellence (2007)
- The Weizmann Prize from the Tel Aviv municipality (2007)
- EMBO Membership (2009)
- Teva Award for Excellence in Memory of Eli Hurvitz (2013)
- The ECI Enzyme Engineering Award (2015)
- The EMET Prize in Life Sciences (2020)
- Gordon Hammes American Chemical Society (ACS) Lectureship (2021)
