= Scott Ginsburg =

American businessman (1952–2024)

Scott Kippel Ginsburg (October 6, 1952 – May 26, 2024) was the owner of Boardwalk Auto Group. Ginsburg also served on the board of directors of Sizmek Inc., a worldwide digital media company (SZMK) listed on the NASDAQ.

== Career history ==
=== U.S. Congress ===
From 1971 until 1981, Ginsburg worked in the US Congress while attending college and law school. He worked for two Iowa Congressmen: U.S. Congressman John C. Culver and U.S. Senator Dick Clark. From 1975 until 1981, Ginsburg worked in a professional capacity of Staff Director and later as Staff Director and General Counsel of the U.S. Senate Labor's Subcommittee on Employment, Poverty and Migratory Labor.

He also worked for the U.S. Senate Subcommittee on Social Security and Medicare. U.S. Senator Gaylord Nelson of Wisconsin chaired both of these Subcommittees. In 1981, Ginsburg left his employment with the U.S. Congress and began a career in private industry.

=== Radio ===
From 1981 until 1983, Ginsburg formulated a business plan to enter the radio broadcasting industry. In 1983, Ginsburg acquired his first radio station and founded Statewide Broadcasting. From 1983 until 1987, this station group expanded from AM and FM radio stations in three Florida cities to include large markets such as Dallas and Chicago.

In 1987, Ginsburg and Cecil Heftel formed H & G Communications, and added Los Angeles, Chicago and Honolulu radio stations in the group. In 1988, Ginsburg established Evergreen Media Corporation, which focused on the nation's largest media markets. Ginsburg took the company public in 1993.

In 1997, Ginsburg co-founded Chancellor Media Corporation (NYSE: AFM), with Tom Hicks of Hicks, Muse, Tate and Furst. Chancellor Broadcasting merged with Evergreen Media Corporation. Ginsburg served as Chancellor's CEO and director. From 1987 until 1998, the radio group headed by Ginsburg moved from the 25th ranked radio group, as measured by Miller Kaplan revenue reports, to become the top billing radio group in the United States.

In 2002, Ginsburg, the former chairman and chief executive officer of Evergreen Media Corporation, was found liable for insider trading and was ordered to pay a $1 million civil penalty by Judge Kenneth L. Ryskamp of the United States District Court for Southern District of Florida.

The civil penalty against Ginsburg was, at the time, the largest penalty ordered by a federal district court against a non-trading tipper.

=== Digital Generation (DG) ===
DG FastChannel was created when DG Systems and FastChannel Networks merged in 2006. DG FastChannel was a provider of digital media services to the advertising, entertainment and broadcast industries. The company had an online media distribution network that was used by advertisers and agencies, and online radio, television, cable, network and print publishing destinations. DG FastChannel was ranked fifth on the 2009 Fortune Small Business list of nation's 100 Fastest Growing Small Public Companies. They also ranked fifth for the 2009 Fortune Fastest Growing Companies in the World listing.

On February 7, 2014, Digital Generation (DG) completed the spin-off of Sizmek and merger transaction with Extreme Reach.

Ginsburg served on the Board of Directors of Sizmek Inc., a worldwide digital media company (SZMK) listed on the NASDAQ.

=== Boardwalk Auto Group ===
Ginsburg brought Porsche to Plano, Texas in 1998, which marked the beginning of Boardwalk Auto Group. Over the next sixteen years, Ginsburg added Audi, Volkswagen, Ferrari, Maserati, Lamborghini and FIAT. In 2012, AutoNation acquired the Dallas area Volkswagen, Porsche and Audi dealerships from Boardwalk Auto Group.

Boardwalk Auto Group also owns Ferrari of San Francisco, Maserati of Marin, Lamborghini North Los Angeles, Audi Glenwood Springs and Glenwood Springs Volkswagen. In 2002, Boardwalk Auto Group was named the fastest growing privately held company in Dallas-Fort Worth by Southern Methodist University's Cox School of Business and the Dallas Business Journal. Boardwalk Ferrari, Boardwalk Maserati and Lamborghini Dallas were named 2014 DealerRater Dealer of the Year for the U.S.

== Education ==
Ginsburg earned his bachelor's degree from George Washington University, and his Juris Doctor degree from Georgetown University Law Center.

== Personal life ==
Ginsburg contributed his time and financial support to numerous charitable activities, including the Dallas Morning News Charities, Klyde Warren Park, Dallas Arboretum, The Dallas Symphony, Dallas International Film Festival, Greenhill School, Shelton School, Georgetown University Law Center, and other organizations that focus on the needs of the homeless and hungry, health, education and the environment. The Scott K. Ginsburg Sport & Fitness Center at Georgetown University Law Center was dedicated on September 8, 2015. In 2019, Georgetown University Law Center announced the expansion of its campus with the purchase of a building to the south of it, made possible by a donation from Ginsburg, which was the largest single gift from an alumnus in the school's history. Ginsburg lived in Dallas and had four children. His son Drew Ginsburg was the co-founder of Tsū (social network).

Ginsburg died in Dallas on May 26, 2024, at the age of 71.
