= Christian Karsten Hansen =

Danish biotechnology entrepreneur

Christian Karsten Hansen (born 18 August 1966) is a Danish biotechnology entrepreneur, investor and inventor, with work in new drugs, molecular biology and biochemistry.

== Personal background ==
Originally from Copenhagen (Denmark), he spent his childhood in Antwerp, Belgium and Caracas, Venezuela before completing high school at Sorø Academy in 1984. Following graduation as MSc chemical engineering from the Technical University of Denmark in 1989, PhD work in molecular biology and biochemistry was conducted at the Pasteur Institute, France and the University of Salamanca, Spain. He also completed an MBA from the Edinburgh Business School, Scotland.

== Professional background ==
Hansen held positions as senior scientist and director of intellectual property management at Novo Nordisk 1992–1999, and was a member of Enzyme Research Management. He co-founded one of the early Danish biotechnology companies, Profound Pharma, in 1999, with Jan Møller Mikkelsen, and remained co-CEO thereof until its acquisition by Maxygen in 2000. In 2001, he co-founded the investment firm Nordic Biotech Advisors, subsequently renamed NB Capital. Also in 2001, he founded C Hansen Invest.

Since 2001, Hansen has co-founded and/or been a board member of numerous privately held and listed biotechnology companies including Osteologix, Nuevolution, Curalogic, Forward Pharma, Rose Pharma, Poalis, Aditech Pharma, Veloxis Pharmaceuticals, H Pharmaceuticals, Isar Pharma, and ParaTech.

== Patents ==
Hansen has filed numerous patent applications in the fields of genetics of bacteria, cellulases and other enzymes, osteoporosis, and protein engineering and uses of biopharmaceuticals. He is named as inventor of issued European patents 510091, 1250154, 1425304, 1534305, 1622629, 1622630, 1732575, 1745791 2266584 and 2266585, and US patents 5,843,720, 5,916,796, 6,066,473, 6,555,660, 6,646,110, 6,831,158, 7,230,081, 7,232,562, 7,504,237, 7,550,565, 7,550,566, 7,595,342, 7,696,153 and 8,541,471.

Various compounds from these companies and patents are in mid and late stages of clinical development.
