= Protein Engineering Design & Selection =

Protein Engineering, Design & Selection
- Discipline: Molecular biology, biochemistry, biotechnology
- Language: English
- Edited by: Robert E. Campbell

Publication details
- Former name: Protein Engineering
- History: 1986–present
- Publisher: Oxford University Press
- Frequency: Continuous
- Open access: Hybrid
- Impact factor: 2.6 (2023)

Standard abbreviations
- ISO 4: Protein Eng. Des. Sel.

Indexing
- ISSN: 1741-0126 (print); 1741-0134 (web)

Links
- Journal homepage

Protein Engineering, Design & Selection (PEDS) is a publication of Oxford University Press. PEDS publishes research papers and review articles that are relevant to the engineering, design and selection of proteins with novel or improved properties for practical applications, or aimed at understanding the fundamental links between protein sequence, structure, dynamics, function, and evolution.

== History ==
Originally titled Protein Engineering and published by IRL Press Ltd, the journal was founded in 1986 under executive editors Anthony R. Rees and Gregory A. Petsko. Later senior editors included Sir Alan R. Fersht, Valerie D. Daggett, Sir Gregory Winter, and Roberto A. Chica.

== Abstracting and indexing ==
Protein Engineering, Design & Selection is indexed in Biological Abstracts, BIOSIS Previews, Biotechnology and Bioengineering Abstracts, Biotechnology Citation Index, CAB Abstracts, Chemical Abstracts, Current Contents, EMBASE, Environmental Science and Pollution Management, Food Science and Technology Abstracts, Journal Citation Reports, ProQuest, and Science Citation Index. According to the latest Journal Citation Reports, the journal has a 2023 impact factor of 2.6.
