= Profound Pharma =

Danish pharmaceutical company

Profound Pharma A/S was a Danish company that develops 2nd generation biopharmaceuticals.

== History ==
Created in Denmark in 1999 by Christian Karsten Hansen and Jan Møller Mikkelsen, formerly of Novo Nordisk, the company was funded by venture capital and a loan from Vækstfonden. After rapidly growing to employ 50 scientists, and filing large numbers of patent applications, the company was acquired by Maxygen in 2000, for $60 million in stock. From its acquisition by Maxygen until 2008, the company continued as a subsidiary of Maxygen forming the cornerstone of its biopharmaceutical business, and contributing to Maxygen´s molecular breeding technology. With NeuroSearch, Genmab and Zealand Pharma, Profound Pharma was among the early members of the Medicon Valley biotech cluster. Its initial directors were Dr. Claus Bræstrup, Prof. Thue Schwartz and Knud Aunstrup.

== Projects ==
Profound Pharma developed improved versions of interferon beta, granulocyte colony-stimulating factor, TNF inhibitors, factor VII and other commercially important protein pharmaceuticals.

== Technologies ==
Profound Pharma used a variety of protein engineering and protein modification technologies including site-directed mutagenesis, rational design, PEGylation, glycosylation, and de-immunization. These technologies complemented the molecular breeding technology of Maxygen.
