= Random chimeragenesis on transient templates =

Random chimeragenesis on transient templates (RACHITT) is a method to perform molecular mutagenesis at a high recombination rate. For example, RACHITT can be used to generate increased rate and extent of biodesulfurization of diesel by modification of dibenzothiophene mono-oxygenase. DNA shuffling is a similar but less powerful method used in directed evolution experiments.
