= Willem P. C. Stemmer =

Dutch scientist and entrepreneur (1957–2013)

- Born: March 12, 1957
- Died: April 2, 2013
- Education: University of Wisconsin–Madison
- Known for: DNA shuffling, Maxygen
- Awards: Charles Stark Draper Prize (2011)
- Scientific career
- Workplaces: Amunix

Willem P. C. "Pim" Stemmer (12 March 1957 – 2 April 2013) was a Dutch scientist and entrepreneur who invented numerous biotechnologies. He was the founder and CEO of Amunix Inc., a company that creates "pharmaceutical proteins with extended dosing frequency". His other prominent inventions include DNA shuffling, now referred to as molecular breeding. He holds more than 97 patents. Stemmer was honored with the Charles Stark Draper Prize in 2011 for the pioneering contributions to directed evolution which won the Nobel Prize in Chemistry in 2018. He was elected as member of National Academy of Engineering.

Stemmer died of cancer on April 2, 2013.

== Education ==
Stemmer attended the Institut Montana Zugerberg, a boarding and day school on the Zugerberg, Switzerland, in the greater Zurich area, from which he graduated in 1975. He developed an interest in biology at the University of Amsterdam in the Netherlands, from which he received a M.S. in biology in 1980.

It was not until 1980, however, when he traveled to University of Wisconsin–Madison that he was introduced to molecular biology. He received a PhD from the University of Wisconsin for his work on bacterial pili and fimbriae involved in host-pathogen interactions. Afterwards, he conducted postdoctoral research with Professor Fred Blattner on phage display of random peptide libraries and antibody fragment expression in E. coli bacteria.

== Career ==
Stemmer initially worked on antibody fragment engineering at Hybritech. He then became a scientist at Affymax, where he invented DNA shuffling (also known as "molecular breeding"). In 1997 he founded Maxygen to commercialize DNA shuffling, which led to the founding of both Verdia and Codexis as spin-offs.

Stemmer founded Avidia in 2003 after inventing its Avimer technology. He co-founded Amunix in 2006 together with Volker Schellenberger; its products comprise a "clinically proven pharmaceutical payload, typically a human protein, genetically fused to ‘XTEN’, a long, unstructured, hydrophilic protein chain", which prolongs serum half-life by "increasing the hydrodynamic radius, thus reducing kidney filtration". In 2008 he founded Versartis< as a spin-off from Amunix; Versartis went public on March 21, 2014.

== Awards and recognition ==
In 2011 Stemmer was honored with the Charles Stark Draper Prize, the United States' top engineering honor, for the pioneering contributions to directed evolution which won the Nobel Prize in Chemistry in 2018. It is a "method used to engineer novel enzymes and biocatalytic processes" for various pharmaceutical and chemical products, allowing researchers to endow proteins and cells with properties that ultimately enable solutions food ingredients, pharmaceuticals, toxicology, agricultural products, and biofuels.

His portfolio of patents from Maxygen was ranked as the #1 portfolio in pharma/biotech for 2003 by MIT's Technology Review, and #2 in a review of the 150 largest pharma and biotechnology companies by The Wall Street Journal in 2006. He received the Doisy Award in 2000 and the David Perlman Award in 2001. In 2005 he won the NASDAQ-sponsored VCynic Syndicate, a "syndicate of venture capitalists" that rated business case studies based on historical, current, and mock companies.
