= Viewscreen =

Viewscreen may refer to:

- Display device
- Projection screen
- Flat panel display
- Computer monitor

== See also ==
- Screen (disambiguation)
- Clear view screen, rotating glass disk in windows on ships used to keep weather off it
- Viewport
- Display (disambiguation)
