= Oded Shoseyov =

Israeli inventor and academic

Prof. Oded Shoseyov
- עודד שושיו
- Born: Oded Shoseyov; Rehovot, Israel
- Awards: The 2002 Outstanding Scientist Polak Award; The 2012 Israel Prime Minister Citation for Entrepreneurship and Innovation; The 2018 Presidential award of the Israel Economic Associations

Academic work
- Institutions: The Hebrew University of Jerusalem
- Main interests: Protein Engineering; Biotechnology; Nano-biotechnology

Oded Shoseyov (Hebrew: עודד שושיו) is an Israeli serial inventor, scholar, and author, who is a distinguished professor of Protein Engineering and Nano Biotechnology at The Hebrew University of Jerusalem. Shoseyov has published over 350 scientific publications and 111 patents to his name.

== Career ==
Initially, Shoseyov studied chemistry and then he moved into agriculture and the bio-engineering of proteins. In 1990, he joined the Faculty of Agriculture at Hebrew University as a Professor of Plant Molecular Biology, where he ran a relatively big laboratory with many students working on protein engineering and nano-biotechnology. Plants have always been his focus, but his main research also extends to industrial and medical areas. For several years, Shoseyov has been developing ways to use genes sourced from humans to produce human collagen in plants. Shoseyov did not confine his work to plants but always find himself going back to them to produce proteins or make composites with plant-derived materials.

According to sources, Prof. Shoseyov is the scientific founder of 19 companies, many of which specialize in developing new materials that have implications for everything from advanced medical implants to the development of sustainable food products. He co-founded Tahiro, a company specialize in creating products that improve brain function ability.

== Recognition and accolades ==
- The 2012 Israel Prime Minister Citation for Entrepreneurship and Innovation

== Selected publications ==
- Role of plant heat-shock proteins and molecular chaperones in the abiotic stress response
- Characterization of SP1, a stress-responsive, boiling-soluble, homo-oligomeric protein from aspen
- Crystallization and preliminary X-ray crystallographic analysis of SP1, a novel chaperone-like protein
- Characterization of BspA, a major boiling-stable, water-stress-responsive protein in aspen (Populus tremula)
- The structural basis of the thermostability of SP1, a novel plant (Populus tremula) boiling stable protein
- Nanobiotechnology Overview
