= Maxygen =

American biopharmaceutical company

Maxygen Inc.
- Company type: Public
- Traded as: Nasdaq: MAXY
- Industry: industrial biotechnology, pharmaceuticals
- Founded: 1997; 29 years ago
- Defunct: 2013; 13 years ago
- Headquarters: Redwood City, California
- Key people: Russell J. Howard (CEO); Alejandro Zaffaroni; Willem P.C. Stemmer; Isaac Stein
- Website: www.maxygen.com

Maxygen Inc. was a biopharmaceutical company focused on developing improved versions of protein drugs using DNA shuffling and other protein modification technologies. The company was headquartered in Redwood City, CA. It was dissolved in 2013.

The Maxygen legacy was revived by Maxygen LLC in 2017 with a focus on providing directed evolution services using the original MolecularBreeding platform. Maxygen LLC was headquartered in Sunnyvale and Newark, CA. It ceased operations in California in December 2023.

== Clinical Programs ==
Maxygen Inc's clinical programs included a novel G-CSF for the treatment of chemotherapy-induced neutropenia, which entered clinical trials in 2006. Maxygen also had a preclinical program, MAXY-4, to develop a novel CTLA4-Ig therapeutic for the treatment of rheumatoid arthritis and other autoimmune diseases.

== Technologies ==
Maxygen Inc. was established to commercially exploit its proprietary recombination-based technologies for creating genetic diversity, known as its Molecular Breeding directed evolution platform. These technologies allow the generation of millions of variant genes and proteins, which then can be screened to identify those with potential commercial interest. This laboratory process mimics the powerful natural process of evolution. The success of Maxygen's technology was documented in numerous scientific publications and patents, in particular a 1998 Nature letter.

== History ==
Maxygen was founded in 1997 by Dr. Alejandro Zaffaroni, a San Francisco Bay Area scientist and entrepreneur, and three co-founders: Dr. Willem P.C. Stemmer, Dr. Russell Howard and Isaac Stein. Dr. Zaffaroni has founded multiple companies including ALZA Corporation, DNAX Research Institute, Affymax, Affymetrix, Symyx Technologies, and Alexza. The company was based in Santa Clara in 1998, suggesting that this might have been where it was founded. At this early stage, they were focused on engineering interferons. By 2000, the company's headquarters was reported as Redwood City.

Maxygen has demonstrated that the MolecularBreeding directed evolution platform has commercial potential in a number of areas, including agriculture, veterinary medicine, enzyme/chemical processes, and human therapeutics. To accelerate its development of improved biopharmaceuticals, Maxygen acquired the Danish company Profound Pharma A/S in 2000, created by Christian Karsten Hansen and Jan Møller Mikkelsen in 1999.

In 2000, the company went public, along with two of its direct competitors: Diversa. Applied Molecular Evolution and Genencor International. Another company, Enchira Biotechnology, was also as direct competitor. By this time, the firm had also licensed a compound, identity unknown, to H. Lundbeck. By 2000, the firm had also applied its technology against subtililsin.

To facilitate the commercial development of products made with its technologies, in 2002 Maxygen established Codexis to focus on enzyme/chemical applications and MaxyAg to focus on agricultural applications. MaxyAg was later renamed Verdia Inc., and Verdia was sold to DuPont in 2004 for $64 million. In addition, Maxygen established Avidia in 2003 to develop protein subunits as commercial products, including therapeutics. Avidia was purchased by Amgen in 2006 for $290 million.

In 2008, the company sold its MAXY-VII candidate drug, a recombinant form of clotting factor VIIa, to Bayer HealthCare.

2009 saw the formation of a joint venture between Maxygen and Astellas called Perseid Therapeutics, in which Maxygen retained majority ownership. The intention was to work through Perseid to exploit most of Maxygen's proprietary technology and intellectual property. By 2011, Astellas exercised an option to fully acquire Perseid and with it the sole candidate drug in its portfolio, MAXY-4 (which became ASP2408 under Astellas), a CTLA-4-immunoglobulin fusion protein therapeutic, which was positioned to be a direct competitor to Orencia, marketed by Bristol-Myers Squibb.

It was reported in June 2013 that the company's board of directors had chosen to "liquidate and dissolve the struggling protein pharmaceuticals developer", which led to the exit of the company's CEO/CFO James Sulat by the end of June 2013. The company's intention at the time was to seek a buyer for its MAXY-G34 candidate drug, a pegylated, granulocyte colony stimulating factor. Maxygen filed a certificate of dissolution on August 29, 2013. The company has ceased all operations.

== Corporate governance ==
Maxygen, Inc.
Chief Executive Officer - Russell Howard
Tassos Gianakakos is a former Director of Business Development for Maxygen.

Maxygen LLC
Chief Scientific Officer - Robert Whalen
Vice-President of Research - James English
