= In situ cyclization of proteins =

Protein engineering technology

The in situ cyclization of proteins (INCYPRO) is a protein engineering technology that increases the durability of proteins and enzymes for biotechnological and biomedical applications. For such applications, it is essential that the used proteins maintain their structural integrity. This is, however, often challenged due to the conditions required for these applications which necessitates protein engineering to stabilize the protein structure. The INCYPRO technology involves the attachment of molecular claps (crosslinks) to a protein, thereby reducing the tendency of the protein to unfold. The resulting INCYPRO-crosslinked proteins are more stable at elevated temperature and in presence of chemical denaturants.

== Technology ==
The INCYPRO technology utilizes tris-reactive molecules to crosslink three defined positions within a protein or protein complex. For example, INCYPRO can involve the introduction of three spatially aligned and solvent-accessible cysteines into the protein that are then reacted with a tris-electrophilic agent. The resulting crosslinked proteins or protein complexes have been shown to exhibit increased stability towards thermal and chemical stress and a lower tendency towards aggregation. So far, the melting temperature of proteins was increased by up to 39°C in a single design step.

== Examples ==
An early example, involved the stabilization of the transpeptidase Sortase A which resulted in INCYPRO-stabilized variants with activity under elevated temperature and in the presence of guanidinium chloride. INCYPRO has also been applied to stabilize the human adaptor KIX domain utilizing different crosslinker molecules. Here, a dependency of protein stability on the hydrophilicity of the crosslink was observed. In addition, a number of homo-trimeric protein complexes was stabilized including the Pseudomonas fluorescens esterase (PFE) and an Enoyl-CoA hydratase. In these cases, enzyme conjugates with overall bicyclic topology were generated.

== See also ==
- Bioconjugation
- Biotechnology
- Protein aggregation
- Protein folding
- Protein quaternary structure
- Protein tertiary structure
