= Codexis =

American protein engineering company

Codexis, Inc.
- Company type: Public
- Traded as: Nasdaq: CDXS; Russell 2000 Component
- Industry: Protein engineering, biocatalysis, industrial enzymes, fine chemicals
- Founded: 2002; 24 years ago
- Headquarters: Redwood City, California, U.S.
- Key people: Stephen Dilly, Ph.D. (CEO and president); Ross Taylor (CFO)
- Revenue: ▲US$68.5 million (FY 2019)
- Number of employees: 165 (as of April 2020)
- Website: codexis.com

Codexis, Inc. is a protein engineering company that develops enzymes for pharmaceutical, food and medical applications.

== History ==
Codexis is based in Redwood City, CA and was incorporated in 2002. It went public in April 2010 on NASDAQ, and in October, acquired Maxygen's MolecularBreeding technology portfolio.

=== Pharmaceutical ===
Codexis won the Presidential Green Chemistry Challenge Award from the U.S. Environmental Protection Agency (EPA) in 2006 for its work on a building block of Lipitor. It then won a second time in 2010 for its work with Merck & Co. on the active ingredient in Januvia.

=== Nutrition ===
In 2017, the company entered a partnership with Tate & Lyle to provide research and development for the production of new ingredients. That same year, Codexis announced a collaboration with Nestle to provide enzymes for metabolic disorders.

=== Biotherapeutics ===
In 2017, Codexis developed a recombinant phenylalanine ammonia-lyase (PAL) enzyme, to act as a substitute phenylalanine hydroxylase (PAH) enzyme for people who suffer from phenylketonuria. The enzyme was in-licensed by Nestle Health Sciences.

In 2020, Takeda Pharmaceutical announced a collaboration with Codexis to research and create gene therapies for rare diseases, including lysosomal storage disorders.

=== Life science ===
In June 2020, they announced a partnership with Molecular Assemblies to engineer enzymes for DNA synthesis.

== Technology ==
Codexis uses directed evolution to develop its enzymes. Using this method, scientists genetically engineer genes, then screen the enzymes produced to see if it creates the properties needed for a specific reaction. Their protein engineering platform, called CodeEvolver, uses machine learning and high-throughput experimentation to learn protein sequence changes and their impacts on protein function.
