= Structure-based combinatorial protein engineering =

Structure-based combinatorial protein engineering (SCOPE) is a synthetic biology technique for creating gene libraries (lineages) of defined composition designed from structural and probabilistic constraints of the encoded proteins. The development of this technique was driven by fundamental questions about protein structure, function, and evolution, although the technique is generally applicable for the creation of engineered proteins with commercially desirable properties. Combinatorial travel through sequence spacetime is the goal of SCOPE.

== Description ==
At its inception, SCOPE was developed as a homology-independent recombination technique to enable the creation of multiple crossover libraries from distantly related genes. In this application, an “exon plate tectonics” design strategy was devised to assemble “equivalent” elements of structure (continental plates) with variability in the junctions linking them (fault lines) to explore global protein space. To create the corresponding library of genes, the breeding scheme of Gregor Mendel was adapted into a PCR strategy to selectively cross hybrid genes, a process of iterative inbreeding to create all possible combinations of coding segments with variable linkages. Genetic complementation in temperature-sensitive E. coli was used as the selection system to successfully identify functional hybrid DNA polymerases of minimal architecture with enhanced phenotypes.

SCOPE was then used to construct a synthetic enzyme lineage, which was biochemically characterized to recapitulate the evolutionary divergence of two modern day enzymes. The rapid evolvability of chemical diversity in terpene synthases were demonstrated through processes akin to both Darwinian gradualism and saltation: some mutational pathways show steady, additive changes, whereas others show drastic jumps between contrasting product specificities with single mutational steps. Further, a metric was devised to describe the chemical distance of mutational steps to derive a chemical-based phylogeny relating sequence variation to chemical output. These examples establish SCOPE as a standardized method for the construction of synthetic gene libraries from close or distantly related parental sequences to identify functional novelty among the encoded proteins.

== See also ==
- Directed evolution
- Enzymology
- Expanded genetic code
- Gene synthesis
- Genome
- Nucleic acid analogues
- Protein design
- Protein engineering
- Protein folding
- Proteomics
- Proteome
- Structural biology
- Synthetic biology
