= Protein–protein interaction screening =

Protein–protein interaction screening refers to the identification of Protein–protein interaction with high-throughput screening methods such as computer- and/or robot-assisted plate reading, flow cytometry analyzing.

The interactions between proteins are central to virtually every process in a living cell. Information about these interactions improves understanding of diseases and can provide the basis for new therapeutic approaches.

== Methods to screen protein–protein interactions ==
Though there are many methods to detect protein–protein interactions, the majority of these methods—such as co-immunoprecipitation, fluorescence resonance energy transfer (FRET) and dual polarisation interferometry—are not screening approaches.

== Ex vivo or in vivo methods ==
Methods that screen protein–protein interactions in the living cells.

Bimolecular fluorescence complementation (BiFC) is a technique for observing the interactions of proteins. Combining it with other new techniques, dual expression recombinase based (DERB) methods can enable the screening of protein–protein interactions and their modulators.

The yeast two-hybrid screen investigates the interaction between artificial fusion proteins inside the nucleus of yeast. This approach can identify the binding partners of a protein without bias. However, the method has a notoriously high false-positive rate, which makes it necessary to verify the identified interactions by co-immunoprecipitation.

== In-vitro methods ==
The tandem affinity purification (TAP) method allows the high-throughput identification of proteins interactions. In contrast with the Y2H approach, the accuracy of the method can be compared to those of small-scale experiments (Collins et al., 2007) and the interactions are detected within the correct cellular environment as by co-immunoprecipitation. However, the TAP tag method requires two successive steps of protein purification, and thus can not readily detect transient protein–protein interactions. Recent genome-wide TAP experiments were performed by Krogan et al., 2006, and Gavin et al., 2006, providing updated protein interaction data for yeast organisms.

Chemical crosslinking is often used to "fix" protein interactions in place before trying to isolate/identify interacting proteins. Common crosslinkers for this application include the non-cleavable [NHS-ester] crosslinker, [bis-sulfosuccinimidyl suberate] (BS3); a cleavable version of BS3, [dithiobis(sulfosuccinimidyl propionate)](DTSSP); and the [imidoester] crosslinker [dimethyl dithiobispropionimidate] (DTBP) that is popular for fixing interactions in ChIP assays.
