= Staggered extension process =

The staggered extension process (also referred to as StEP) is a common technique used in biotechnology and molecular biology to create new, mutated genes with qualities of one or more initial genes.

The technique itself is a modified polymerase chain reaction with very short (approximately 10 seconds) cycles. In these cycles the elongation of DNA is very quick (only a few hundred base pairs) and synthesized fragments anneal with complementary fragments of other strands. In this way, mutations of the initial genes are shuffled and in the end genes with new combinations of mutations are amplified.

The StEP protocol has been found to be useful as a method of directed evolution for the discovery of enzymes useful to industry.
