= Yeast display =

Protein engineering technique

Yeast display (or yeast surface display) is a protein engineering technique that uses the expression of recombinant proteins incorporated into the cell wall of yeast. This method can be used for several applications such as isolating and engineering antibodies and determining host-microbe interactions.

== Development ==
The yeast display technique was first published by the laboratory of Professor K. Dane Wittrup and Eric T. Boder. The technology was sold to Abbott Laboratories in 2001.

== How it works ==
A protein of interest is displayed as a fusion to the Aga2p protein on the surface of yeast. The Aga2p protein is used by yeast to mediate cell–cell contacts during yeast cell mating. As such, display of a protein via Aga2p likely projects the fusion protein from the cell surface, minimizing potential interactions with other molecules on the yeast cell wall. The use of magnetic separation and flow cytometry in conjunction with a yeast display library can be highly effective method to isolate high affinity protein ligands against nearly any receptor through directed evolution.

== Advantages and disadvantages ==
Advantages of yeast display over other in vitro evolution methods include eukaryotic expression and post translational processing, quality control mechanisms of the eukaryotic secretory pathway, minimal avidity effects, and quantitative library screening through fluorescent-activated cell sorting (FACS). Yeast are eukaryotic organisms that allow for complex post-translational modifications to proteins that no other display libraries are able to provide.

Disadvantages include smaller mutant library sizes compared to alternative methods and differential glycosylation in yeast compared to mammalian cells. Alternative methods for protein evolution in vitro are mammalian display, phage display, ribosome display, bacterial display, and mRNA display.
