= MRNA display =

To identify peptides binding a target

mRNA display is a method to identify peptides which bind to a particular molecular target. The process utilizes two main components: an immobilized target and a peptide library in which each peptide is covalently linked to an mRNA:cDNA which encodes it. The immobilized target is mixed with the library in a binding step, then those peptide-mRNA:cDNA fusions which do not bind are washed away. The resulting mixture, which is enriched in peptide-mRNA:cDNA fusions that bind, is then amplified via a polymerase chain reaction (PCR). A new peptide library enriched in binding sequences is prepared from this cDNA, and the process is repeated for several rounds. The result is the isolation of nucleotides with sequences that encode peptides with high affinity for the target.

== Peptide-mRNA fusions ==
Puromycin is an analogue of the 3' end of a tyrosyl-tRNA with a part of its structure mimics a molecule of adenosine, and the other part mimics a molecule of tyrosine. Compared to the cleavable ester bond in a tyrosyl-tRNA, puromycin has a non-hydrolysable amide bond. As a result, puromycin interferes with translation, and causes premature release of translation products.

Figure 1. mRNA-peptide Fusion Formation. a. Ribosome moves along the mRNA template and nascent peptide is being made. When the ribosome reaches the 3' end of the template, the fused puromycin will enter the A site of the ribosome. b. The mRNA-peptide fusion is released.

All mRNA templates used for mRNA display technology have puromycin at their 3' end. As translation proceeds, the ribosome moves along the mRNA template, and once it reaches the 3' end of the template, the fused puromycin will enter ribosome's A site and be incorporated into the nascent peptide. The mRNA-peptide fusion is then released from the ribosome (Figure 1).

To synthesize an mRNA-peptide fusion, the fused puromycin is not the only modification to the mRNA template. Oligonucleotides and other spacers need to be incorporated along with the puromycin to provide flexibility and proper length for the puromycin to enter the A site. Ideally, the linker between the 3' end of an mRNA and the puromycin has to be flexible and long enough to allow the puromycin to enter the A site upon translation of the last codon. This enables the efficient production of high-quality, full-length mRNA-peptide fusions. Rihe Liu et al. optimized the 3'-puromycin oligonucleotide spacer. They reported that dA25 (a nucleotide sequence of 25 deoxyadenosine residues) in combination with a Spacer 9 (Glen Research), and dAdCdCP at the 5' terminus worked the best for the fusion reaction. They found that linkers longer than 40 nucleotides and shorter than 16 nucleotides showed greatly reduced efficiency of fusion formation. Also, when the sequence rUrUP was present adjacent to the puromycin, fusion did not form efficiently.

In addition to providing flexibility and length, the poly dA portion of the linker also allows further purification of the mRNA-peptide fusion due to its high affinity for dT cellulose resin. The mRNA-peptide fusions can be selected over immobilized selection targets for several rounds with increasing stringency. After each round of selection, those library members that stay bound to the immobilized target are PCR amplified, and non-binders are washed off.

== Preparation of the peptide library ==
Figure 2. Splint Aid Single Stranded mRNA/DNA T4 DNA Ligase Ligation

The synthesis of an mRNA display library starts from the synthesis of a DNA library. A DNA library for any protein or small peptide of interest can be synthesized by solid-phase synthesis followed by PCR amplification. Usually, each member of this DNA library has a T7 RNA polymerase transcription site and a ribosomal binding site at the 5' end. The T7 promoter region allows large-scale in vitro T7 transcription to transcribe the DNA library into an mRNA library, which provides templates for the in vitro translation reaction later. The ribosomal binding site in the 5'-untranslated region (5' UTR) is designed according to the in vitro translation system to be used. There are two popular commercially available in vitro translation systems. One is E. coli S30 Extract System (Promega) that requires a Shine-Dalgarno sequence in the 5' UTR as a ribosomal binding site; the other one is Red Nova Lysate (Novagen), which needs a ΔTMV ribosomal binding site.

Once the mRNA library is generated, it will be Urea-PAGE purified and ligated using T4 DNA ligase to the DNA spacer linker containing puromycin at the 3' end. In this ligation step, a piece of mRNA is ligated with a single stranded DNA with the help from T4 DNA ligase. This is not a standard T4 DNA ligase ligation reaction, where two pieces of double stranded DNA are ligated together. To increase the yield of this special ligation, a single stranded DNA splint may be used to aid the ligation reaction. The 5' terminus of the splint is designed to be complementary to the 3' end of the mRNA, and the 3' terminus of the splint is designed to be complementary to the 5' end of the DNA spacer linker, which usually consists of poly dA nucleotides (Figure 2).

Figure 3. Selection Cycle.

The ligated mRNA-DNA-puromycin library is translated in Red Nova Lysate (Novagen) or E. coli S30 Extract System (Promega), resulting in peptides covalently linked in cis to the encoding mRNA. The in vitro translation can also be done in a PURE (protein synthesis using recombinant elements) system. PURE system is an E. coli cell-free translation system in which only essential translation components are present. Some components, such as amino acids and aminoacyl-tRNA synthases (AARSs) can be omitted from the system. Instead, chemically acylated tRNA can be added into the PURE system. It has been shown that some unnatural amino acids, such as N-methyl-amino acid acylated tRNA can be incorporated into peptides or mRNA-peptide fusions in a PURE system.

After translation, the single-stranded mRNA portions of the fusions will be converted to heteroduplex of RNA/DNA by reverse transcriptase to eliminate any unwanted RNA secondary structures, and render the nucleic acid portion of the fusion more stable. This step is a standard reverse transcription reaction. For instance, it can be done by using Superscript II (GIBCO-BRL) following the manufacturer's protocol.

== Enrichment steps ==
The peptide-mRNA:cDNA fusions can be selected over immobilized selection targets for several rounds (Figure 3). There might be a relatively high background for the first few rounds of selection, and this can be minimized by increasing selection stringency, such as adjusting salt concentration, amount of detergent, and/or temperature during the target/fusion binding period. Following binding selection, those library members that stay bound to the immobilized target are PCR amplified. The PCR amplification step will enrich the population from the mRNA-display library that has higher affinity for the immobilized target. Error-prone PCR can also be done in between each round of selection to further increase the diversity of the mRNA-display library and reduce background in selection.

A less time-consuming protocol for mRNA display was recently published.

== Advantages ==
Although there are many other molecular display technologies, such as phage display, bacterial display, yeast display, and ribosome display, mRNA display technology has many advantages over the others. The first three biological display libraries listed have peptides or proteins expressed on the respective microorganism's surface and the accompanying coding information for each peptide or protein is retrievable from the microorganism's genome. However, the library size for these three in vivo display systems is limited by the transformation efficiency of each organism. For example, the library size for phage and bacterial display is limited to 1-10 × 10^9 different members. The library size for yeast display is even smaller. Moreover, these cell-based display system only allow the screening and enrichment of peptides/proteins containing natural amino acids. In contrast, mRNA display and ribosome display are in vitro selection methods. They allow a library size as large as 10^15 different members. The large library size increases the probability to select very rare sequences, and also improves the diversity of the selected sequences. In addition, in vitro selection methods remove unwanted selection pressure, such as poor protein expression, and rapid protein degradation, which may reduce the diversity of the selected sequences. Finally, in vitro selection methods allow the application of in vitro mutagenesis and recombination techniques throughout the selection process.

Although both ribosome display and mRNA display are in vitro selection methods, mRNA display has some advantage over the ribosome display technology. mRNA display utilizes covalent mRNA-peptide complexes linked through puromycin; whereas, ribosome display utilizes stalled, noncovalent ribosome-mRNA-peptide complexes. For ribosome display, selection stringency is limited to keep ribosome-mRNA-peptide in a complex because of the noncovalent ribosome-mRNA-peptide complexes. This may cause difficulties in reducing background binding during the selection cycle. Also, the peptides under selection in a ribosome display system are attached to an enormous rRNA-protein complex, a ribosome, which has a molecular weight of more than 2,000,000 Da. There might be some unpredictable interaction between the selection target and the ribosome, and this may lead to a loss of potential binders during the selection cycle. In contrast, the puromycin DNA spacer linker used in mRNA display technology is much smaller comparing to a ribosome. This linker may have less chance to interact with an immobilized selection target. Thus, mRNA display technology is more likely to give less biased results.

== Applications ==
In 1997, Roberts and Szostak showed that fusions between a synthetic mRNA and its encoded myc epitope could be enriched from a pool of random sequence mRNA-peptide fusions by immunoprecipitation.

Nine years later, Fukuda and colleagues chose mRNA display method for in vitro evolution of single-chain Fv (scFv) antibody fragments. They selected six different scFv mutants with five consensus mutations. However, kinetic analysis of these mutants showed that their antigen-specificity remained similar to that of the wild type. However, they have demonstrated that two of the five consensus mutations were within the complementarity determining regions (CDRs). And they concluded that mRNA display has the potential for rapid artificial evolution of high-affinity diagnostic and therapeutic antibodies by optimizing their CDRs.

Roberts and coworkers have demonstrated that unnatural peptide oligomers consisting of an N-substituted amino acid can be synthesized as mRNA-peptide fusions. N-substituted amino acid-containing peptides have been associated with good proteolytic stability and improved pharmacokinetic properties. This work indicates that mRNA display technology has the potential for selecting drug-like peptides for therapeutic usage resistant to proteolysis.

== See also ==
- Ribosome display
- Protein engineering
- Protein–protein interaction screening
