= Display (social network) =

Online social networking service

Display Inc.
- Company type: Privately held company
- Website type: Social networking service
- Available in: English
- Headquarters: Norwalk, Connecticut, US
- Area served: Worldwide
- Founders: John Acunto, Scot Weisberg, Sean Cross, David Kerzner
- Key people: John Acunto, Scot Weisberg, Sean Cross
- Industry: Internet
- Website: displaysocial.com
- Current status: Inactive

Display Inc., stylized as display, was an online social media and networking service based in Norwalk, Connecticut. The display app officially launched in May 2021. The app was permanently shut down June 18, 2025.

== History ==
In September 2019, display (formerly Tsū) announced its planned relaunch. According to Chief Executive Officer John Acunto, display would share ad revenue with users, a 50% payout of ad revenue. display also incorporated protections against spam and empowers users to access data, analytics and insights related to their content.

In an interview with Fox Business (in response to the October 29 NCAA Board of Governors unanimous vote to allow student-athletes to be paid for the use of their name, image and likeness), Tiki Barber, former NY Giants running back, cited display as a “great platform” to put the new NCAA rules to use, adding that display enables influencers of all kinds to have the ability to monetize their own content and brands. Barber went on to say that display is creating a platform that gives all users access to brand partnership, by sharing in ad revenue, providing storefronts and more. display's John Acunto echoed Barber's sentiment saying that college athletes were just one example of those who could benefit from display: "I see this as an opportunity for all kinds of categories of people who are influencers [and] who have brands to engage with us."

== App features ==
Available for iOS and Android devices, main features include:

- Profiles – Similar to other social media sites, a display “Profile” allows the user to upload photos and videos, friend/ follow, post, create a bio and promote personal websites.
- Store - Creators can personally curate a marketplace in an easily created for, enabling purchase at the point of discovery.
- Bank – The display bank allows users to be paid out via PayPal.
- Analytics (“Insights”) – In-app console that provides post engagement data to the user. Shows users what posts performed the best, incentivizing them to post more content that their audience enjoys.
- Live Streaming - Users can live stream from the app to their friends, followers and family. Users can interact with the live streaming creator via a chat function
- display TV – display's built-in television channel that includes several daily livestream components. Both the livestream and pre-recorded shows containing educational material, announcements, news and updates, and spotlight and promote Tsū user content through reviews and interviews.
- Communities – Communities are ways for display users to communicate and exchange ideas and plan and promote events. Communities can be public or private.
