= Ribosome display =

Aspect of molecular biology

Ribosome display is a technique used to perform in vitro protein evolution to create proteins that can bind to a desired ligand. The process results in translated proteins that are associated with their mRNA progenitor which is used, as a complex, to bind to an immobilized ligand in a selection step. The mRNA-protein hybrids that bind well are then reverse transcribed to cDNA and their sequence amplified via PCR. The result is a nucleotide sequence that can be used to create tightly binding proteins.

== Ribosome display process ==
Ribosome display begins with a native library of DNA sequences coding for polypeptides. Each sequence is transcribed, and then translated in vitro into a polypeptide. However, the DNA library coding for a particular library of binding proteins is genetically fused to a spacer sequence lacking a stop codon before its end. The lack of a stop codon prevents release factors from binding and triggering the disassembly of the translational complex. So, this spacer sequence stays attached to the peptidyl tRNA and occupies the ribosomal tunnel, and thus allows the protein of interest to protrude out of the ribosome and fold. What results is a complex of mRNA, ribosome, and protein which can bind to surface-bound ligand. This complex is stabilized with the lowering of temperature and the addition of cations such as Mg^{2+}.

During the subsequent binding, or panning, stages, the complex is introduced to a surface-bound ligand. This can be accomplished in several ways, for example using an affinity chromatography column with a resin bed containing ligand, a 96-well plate with immobilized surface-bound ligand, or magnetic beads that have been coated with ligand. The complexes that bind well are immobilized. Subsequent elution of the binders via high salt concentrations, chelating agents, or mobile ligands which complex with the binding motif of the protein allow dissociation of the mRNA. The mRNA can then be reverse transcribed back into cDNA, undergo mutagenesis, and iteratively fed into the process with greater selective pressure to isolate even better binders.

== Advantages of ribosome display ==
By having the protein progenitor attached to the complex, the processes of ribosome display skips the microarray/peptide bead/multiple-well sequence separation that is common in assays involving nucleotide hybridization and provides a ready way to amplify the proteins that do bind without decrypting the sequence until necessary. At the same time, this method relies on generating large, concentrated pools of sequence diversity without gaps and keeping these sequences from degrading, hybridizing, and reacting with each other in ways that would create sequence-space gaps.

It has a successful track record in the engineering of antibody and protein therapeutic leads and is still widely used in these areas.

Competing methods for protein evolution in vitro are phage display, yeast display, bacterial display, and mRNA display. peptides (Mattheakis, Bhatt and Dow) As it is performed entirely in vitro, there are two main advantages over other selection technologies. First, the diversity of the library is not limited by the transformation efficiency of bacterial cells, but only by the number of ribosomes and different mRNA molecules present in the test tube. Second, random mutations can be introduced easily after each selection round, as no library must be transformed after any diversification step. This allows facile directed evolution of binding proteins over several generations.

A prerequisite for the selection of proteins from libraries is the coupling of genotype (RNA, DNA) and phenotype (protein). In ribosome display, this link is accomplished during in vitro translation by stabilizing the complex consisting of the ribosome, the mRNA and the nascent, correctly folded polypeptide. The ribosomal complexes are allowed to bind to surface-immobilized target. Whereas non-bound complexes are washed away, mRNA of the complexes displaying a binding polypeptide can be recovered, and thus, the genetic information of the binding polypeptides is available for analysis.

== See also ==
- mRNA display
