= Directed evolution =

Protein engineering method

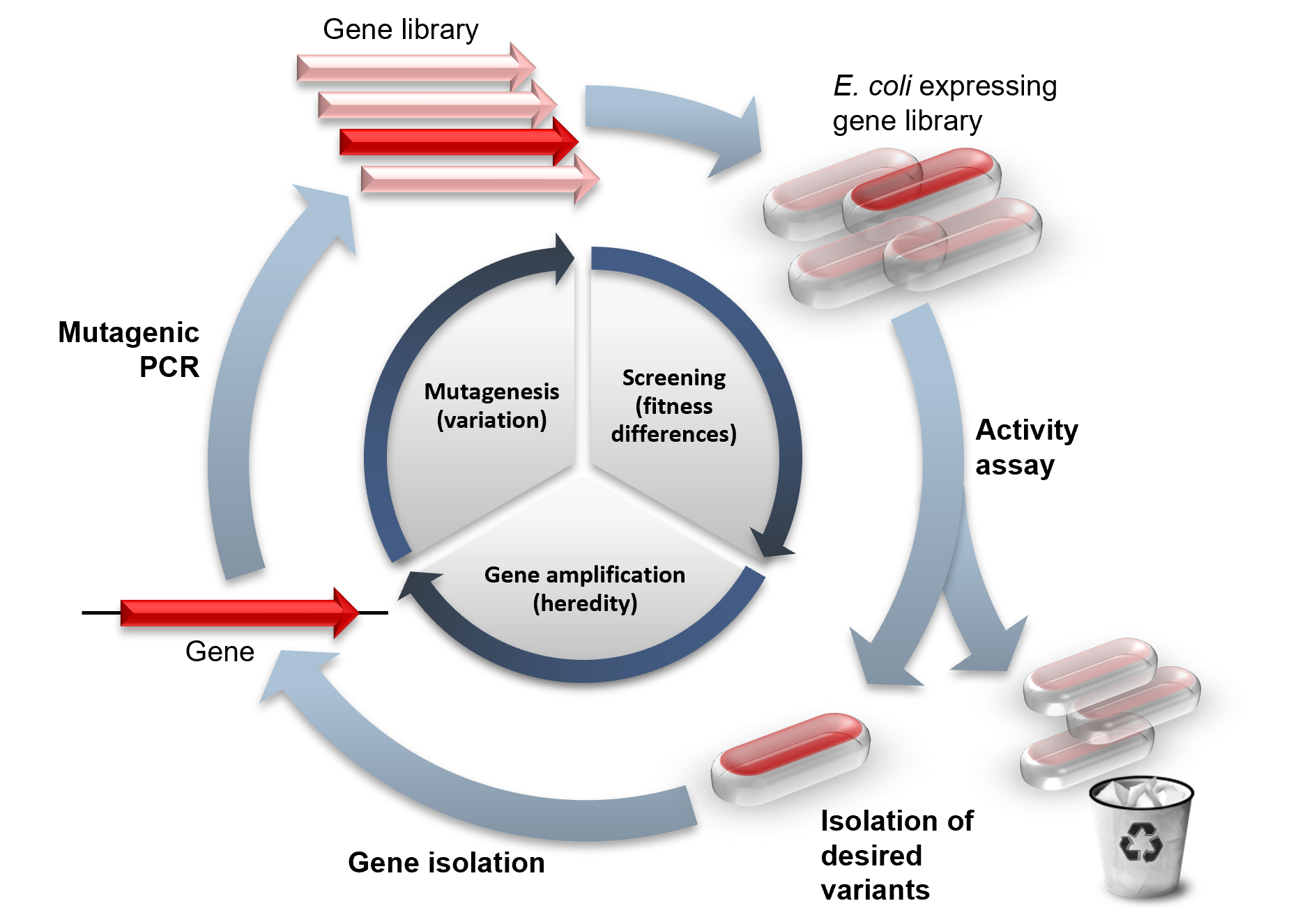
An example of directed evolution with comparison to natural evolution. The inner cycle indicates the 3 stages of the directed evolution cycle with the natural process being mimicked in brackets. The outer circle demonstrates steps in a typical experiment. The red symbols indicate functional variants, the pale symbols indicate variants with reduced function.

Directed evolution (DE) is a method used in protein engineering that mimics the process of natural evolution to steer proteins or nucleic acids toward a user-defined goal. It consists of subjecting a gene to iterative rounds of mutagenesis (creating a library of variants), selection (expressing those variants and isolating members with the desired function) and amplification (generating a template for the next round). It can be performed in vivo (in living organisms), or in vitro (in cells or free in solution). Directed evolution is used both for protein engineering as an alternative to rationally designing modified proteins, as well as for experimental evolution studies of fundamental evolutionary principles in a controlled, laboratory environment.

== History ==
Directed evolution has its origins in the 1960s with the evolution of RNA molecules in the "Spiegelman's Monster" experiment. The concept was extended to protein evolution via evolution of bacteria under selection pressures that favoured the evolution of a single gene in its genome.

Early phage display techniques in the 1980s allowed targeting of mutations and selection to a single protein. This enabled selection of enhanced binding proteins, but was not yet compatible with selection for catalytic activity of enzymes. Methods to evolve enzymes were developed in the 1990s and brought the technique to a wider scientific audience. The field rapidly expanded with new methods for making libraries of gene variants and for screening their activity. The development of directed evolution methods was honored in 2018 with the awarding of the Nobel Prize in Chemistry to Frances Arnold for evolution of enzymes, and George Smith and Gregory Winter for phage display.

== Principles ==
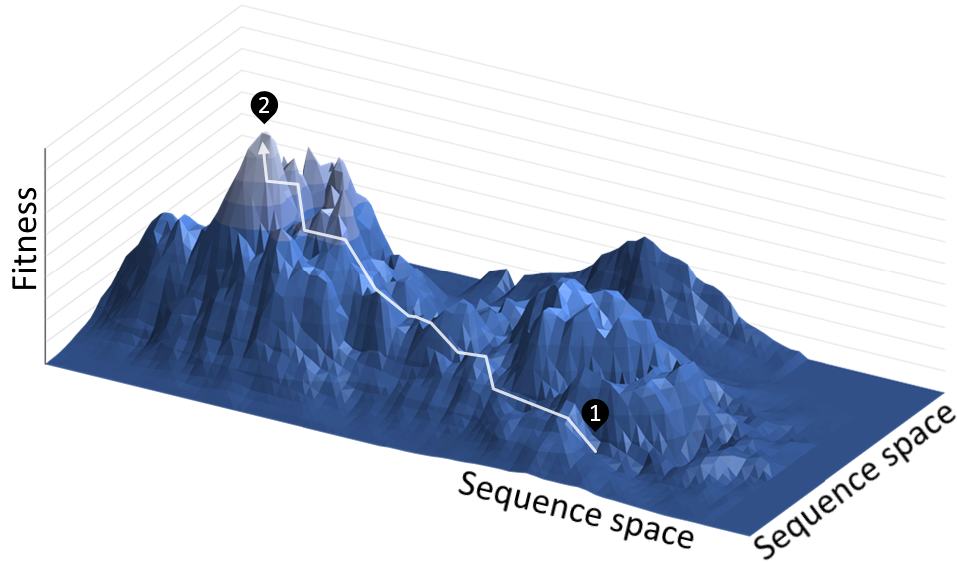
Directed evolution is analogous to climbing a hill on a 'fitness landscape' where elevation represents the desired property. Each round of selection samples mutants on all sides of the starting template (1) and selects the mutant with the highest elevation, thereby climbing the hill. This is repeated until a local summit is reached (2).

Directed evolution is a mimic of the natural evolution cycle in a laboratory setting. Evolution requires three things to happen: variation between replicators, that the variation causes fitness differences upon which selection acts, and that this variation is heritable. In DE, a single gene is evolved by iterative rounds of mutagenesis, selection or screening, and amplification. Rounds of these steps are typically repeated, using the best variant from one round as the template for the next to achieve stepwise improvements.

The likelihood of success in a directed evolution experiment is directly related to the total library size, as evaluating more mutants increases the chances of finding one with the desired properties.

=== Generating variation ===
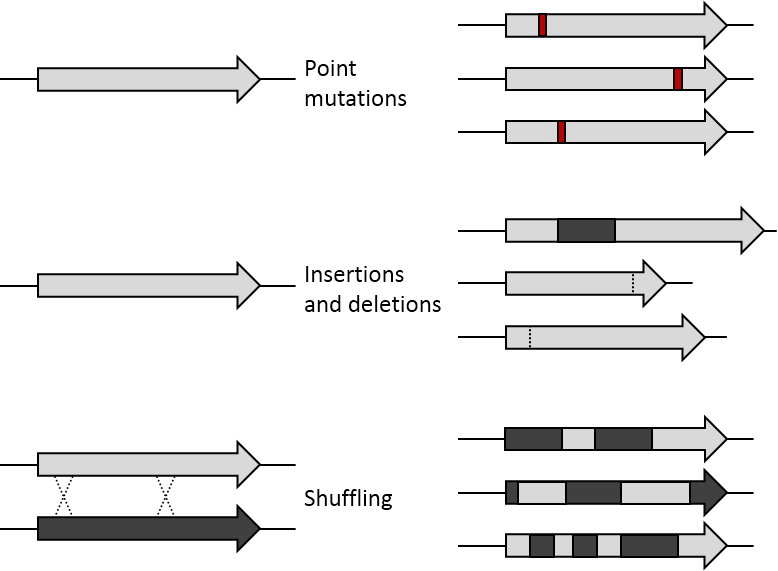
Starting gene (left) and library of variants (right). Point mutations change single nucleotides. Insertions and deletions add or remove sections of DNA. Shuffling recombines segments of two (or more) similar genes.

How DNA libraries generated by random mutagenesis sample sequence space. The amino acid substituted into a given position is shown. Each dot or set of connected dots is one member of the library. Error-prone PCR randomly mutates some residues to other amino acids. Alanine scanning replaces each residue of the protein with alanine, one-by-one. Site saturation substitutes each of the 20 possible amino acids (or some subset of them) at a single position, one-by-one.

The first step in performing a cycle of directed evolution is the generation of a library of variant genes. The sequence space for random sequence is vast (10^{130} possible sequences for a 100 amino acid protein) and extremely sparsely populated by functional proteins. Neither experimental, nor natural evolution can ever get close to sampling so many sequences. Of course, natural evolution samples variant sequences close to functional protein sequences and this is imitated in DE by mutagenising an already functional gene. Some calculations suggest it is entirely feasible that for all practical (i.e. functional and structural) purposes, protein sequence space has been fully explored during the course of evolution of life on Earth.

The starting gene can be mutated by random point mutations (by chemical mutagens or error prone PCR) and insertions and deletions (by transposons). Gene recombination can be mimicked by DNA shuffling of several sequences (usually of more than 70% sequence identity) to jump into regions of sequence space between the shuffled parent genes. Finally, specific regions of a gene can be systematically randomised for a more focused approach based on structure and function knowledge. Depending on the method, the library generated will vary in the proportion of functional variants it contains. Even if an organism is used to express the gene of interest, by mutagenising only that gene the rest of the organism's genome remains the same and can be ignored for the evolution experiment (to the extent of providing a constant genetic environment).

=== Detecting fitness differences ===
The majority of mutations are deleterious and so libraries of mutants tend to mostly have variants with reduced activity. Therefore, a high-throughput assay is vital for measuring activity to find the rare variants with beneficial mutations that improve the desired properties. Two main categories of method exist for isolating functional variants. Selection systems directly couple protein function to survival of the gene, whereas screening systems individually assay each variant and allow a quantitative threshold to be set for sorting a variant or population of variants of a desired activity. Both selection and screening can be performed in living cells (in vivo evolution) or performed directly on the protein or RNA without any cells (in vitro evolution).

During in vivo evolution, each cell (usually bacteria or yeast) is transformed with a plasmid containing a different member of the variant library. In this way, only the gene of interest differs between the cells, with all other genes being kept the same. The cells express the protein either in their cytoplasm or surface where its function can be tested. This format has the advantage of selecting for properties in a cellular environment, which is useful when the evolved protein or RNA is to be used in living organisms. When performed without cells, DE involves using in vitro transcription translation to produce proteins or RNA free in solution or compartmentalised in artificial microdroplets. This method has the benefits of being more versatile in the selection conditions (e.g. temperature, solvent), and can express proteins that would be toxic to cells. Furthermore, in vitro evolution experiments can generate far larger libraries (up to 10^{15}) because the library DNA need not be inserted into cells (often a limiting step).

==== Selection ====
Selection for binding activity is conceptually simple. The target molecule is immobilised on a solid support, a library of variant proteins is flowed over it, poor binders are washed away, and the remaining bound variants recovered to isolate their genes. Binding of an enzyme to immobilised covalent inhibitor has been also used as an attempt to isolate active catalysts. This approach, however, only selects for single catalytic turnover and is not a good model of substrate binding or true substrate reactivity. If an enzyme activity can be made necessary for cell survival, either by synthesizing a vital metabolite, or destroying a toxin, then cell survival is a function of enzyme activity. Such systems are generally only limited in throughput by the transformation efficiency of cells. They are also less expensive and labour-intensive than screening, however they are typically difficult to engineer, prone to artefacts and give no information on the range of activities present in the library.

==== Screening ====
An alternative to selection is a screening system. Each variant gene is individually expressed and assayed to quantitatively measure the activity (most often by a colourgenic or fluorogenic product). The variants are then ranked and the experimenter decides which variants to use as templates for the next round of DE. Even the most high throughput assays usually have lower coverage than selection methods but give the advantage of producing detailed information on each one of the screened variants. This disaggregated data can also be used to characterise the distribution of activities in libraries which is not possible in simple selection systems. Screening systems, therefore, have advantages when it comes to experimentally characterising adaptive evolution and fitness landscapes.

=== Ensuring heredity ===
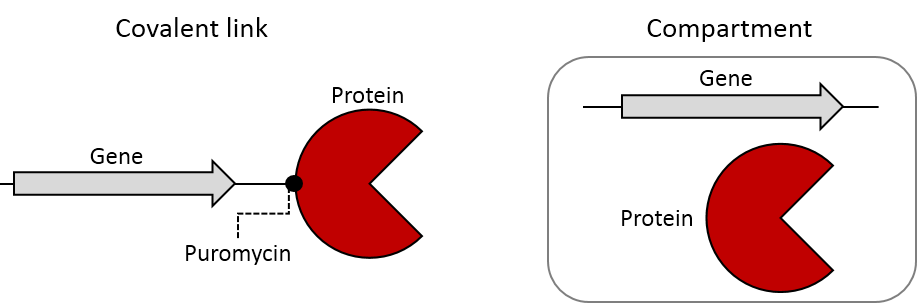
An expressed protein can either be covalently linked to its gene (as in mRNA, left) or compartmentalized with it (cells or artificial compartments, right). Either way ensures that the gene can be isolated based on the activity of the encoded protein.

When functional proteins have been isolated, it is necessary that their genes are too, therefore a genotype–phenotype link is required. This can be covalent, such as mRNA display where the mRNA gene is linked to the protein at the end of translation by puromycin. Alternatively the protein and its gene can be co-localised by compartmentalisation in living cells or emulsion droplets. The gene sequences isolated are then amplified by PCR or by transformed host bacteria. Either the single best sequence, or a pool of sequences can be used as the template for the next round of mutagenesis. The repeated cycles of Diversification-Selection-Amplification generate protein variants adapted to the applied selection pressures.

== Comparison to rational protein design ==
=== Advantages of directed evolution ===
Rational design of a protein relies on an in-depth knowledge of the protein structure, as well as its catalytic mechanism. Specific changes are then made by site-directed mutagenesis in an attempt to change the function of the protein. A drawback of this is that even when the structure and mechanism of action of the protein are well known, the change due to mutation is still difficult to predict. Therefore, an advantage of DE is that there is no need to understand the mechanism of the desired activity or how mutations would affect it.

=== Limitations of directed evolution ===
A restriction of directed evolution is that a high-throughput assay is required in order to measure the effects of a large number of different random mutations. This can require extensive research and development before it can be used for directed evolution. Additionally, such assays are often highly specific to monitoring a particular activity and so are not transferable to new DE experiments.

Additionally, selecting for improvement in the assayed function simply generates improvements in the assayed function. To understand how these improvements are achieved, the properties of the evolving enzyme have to be measured. Improvement of the assayed activity can be due to improvements in enzyme catalytic activity or enzyme concentration. There is also no guarantee that improvement on one substrate will improve activity on another. This is particularly important when the desired activity cannot be directly screened or selected for and so a 'proxy' substrate is used. DE can lead to evolutionary specialisation to the proxy without improving the desired activity. Consequently, choosing appropriate screening or selection conditions is vital for successful DE.

The speed of evolution in an experiment also poses a limitation on the utility of directed evolution. For instance, evolution of a particular phenotype, while theoretically feasible, may occur on time-scales that are not practically feasible. Recent theoretical approaches have aimed to overcome the limitation of speed through an application of counter-diabatic driving techniques from statistical physics, though this has yet to be implemented in a directed evolution experiment.

=== Combinatorial approaches ===
Combined, 'semi-rational' approaches are being investigated to address the limitations of both rational design and directed evolution. Beneficial mutations are rare, so large numbers of random mutants have to be screened to find improved variants. 'Focused libraries' concentrate on randomising regions thought to be richer in beneficial mutations for the mutagenesis step of DE. A focused library contains fewer variants than a traditional random mutagenesis library and so does not require such high-throughput screening.

Creating a focused library requires some knowledge of which residues in the structure to mutate. For example, knowledge of the active site of an enzyme may allow just the residues known to interact with the substrate to be randomised. Alternatively, knowledge of which protein regions are variable in nature can guide mutagenesis in just those regions.

== Applications ==
Directed evolution is frequently used for protein engineering as an alternative to rational design, but can also be used to investigate fundamental questions of enzyme evolution.

=== Protein engineering ===
As a protein engineering tool, DE has been most successful in three areas:

1. Improving protein stability for biotechnological use at high temperatures or in harsh solvents
2. Improving binding affinity of therapeutic antibodies (Affinity maturation) and the activity of de novo designed enzymes
3. Altering substrate specificity of existing enzymes, (often for use in industry)

=== Evolution studies ===
The study of natural evolution is traditionally based on extant organisms and their genes. However, research is fundamentally limited by the lack of fossils (and particularly the lack of ancient DNA sequences) and incomplete knowledge of ancient environmental conditions. Directed evolution investigates evolution in a controlled system of genes for individual enzymes, ribozymes and replicators (similar to experimental evolution of eukaryotes, prokaryotes and viruses).

DE allows control of selection pressure, mutation rate and environment (both the abiotic environment such as temperature, and the biotic environment, such as other genes in the organisms). Additionally, there is a complete record of all evolutionary intermediate genes. This allows for detailed measurements of evolutionary processes, for example epistasis, evolvability, adaptive constraint fitness landscapes, and neutral networks.

=== Adaptive laboratory evolution of microbial proteomes ===
The natural amino acid composition of proteomes can be changed by global canonical amino acids substitutions with suitable noncanonical counterparts under the experimentally imposed selective pressure. For example, global proteome-wide substitutions of natural amino acids with fluorinated analogs have been attempted in Escherichia coli and Bacillus subtilis. A complete tryptophan substitution with thienopyrrole-alanine in response to 20899 UGG codons in Escherichia coli was reported in 2015 by Budisa and Söll. The experimental evolution of microbial strains with a clear-cut accommodation of an additional amino acid is expected to be instrumental for widening the genetic code experimentally. Directed evolution typically targets a particular gene for mutagenesis and then screens the resulting variants for a phenotype of interest, often independent of fitness effects, whereas adaptive laboratory evolution selects many genome-wide mutations that contribute to the fitness of actively growing cultures.

== See also ==
- Applications:
  - Protein engineering
  - Enzyme engineering
  - Protein design
  - Expanded genetic code
  - Xenobiology
- Mutagenesis:
  - Random mutagenesis
  - Saturated mutagenesis
  - Staggered extension process
- Selection and screening:
  - Yeast display
  - Bacterial display
  - Phage display
  - Ribosome display
  - mRNA display
  - FACS
