= Drew Endy =

American biologist

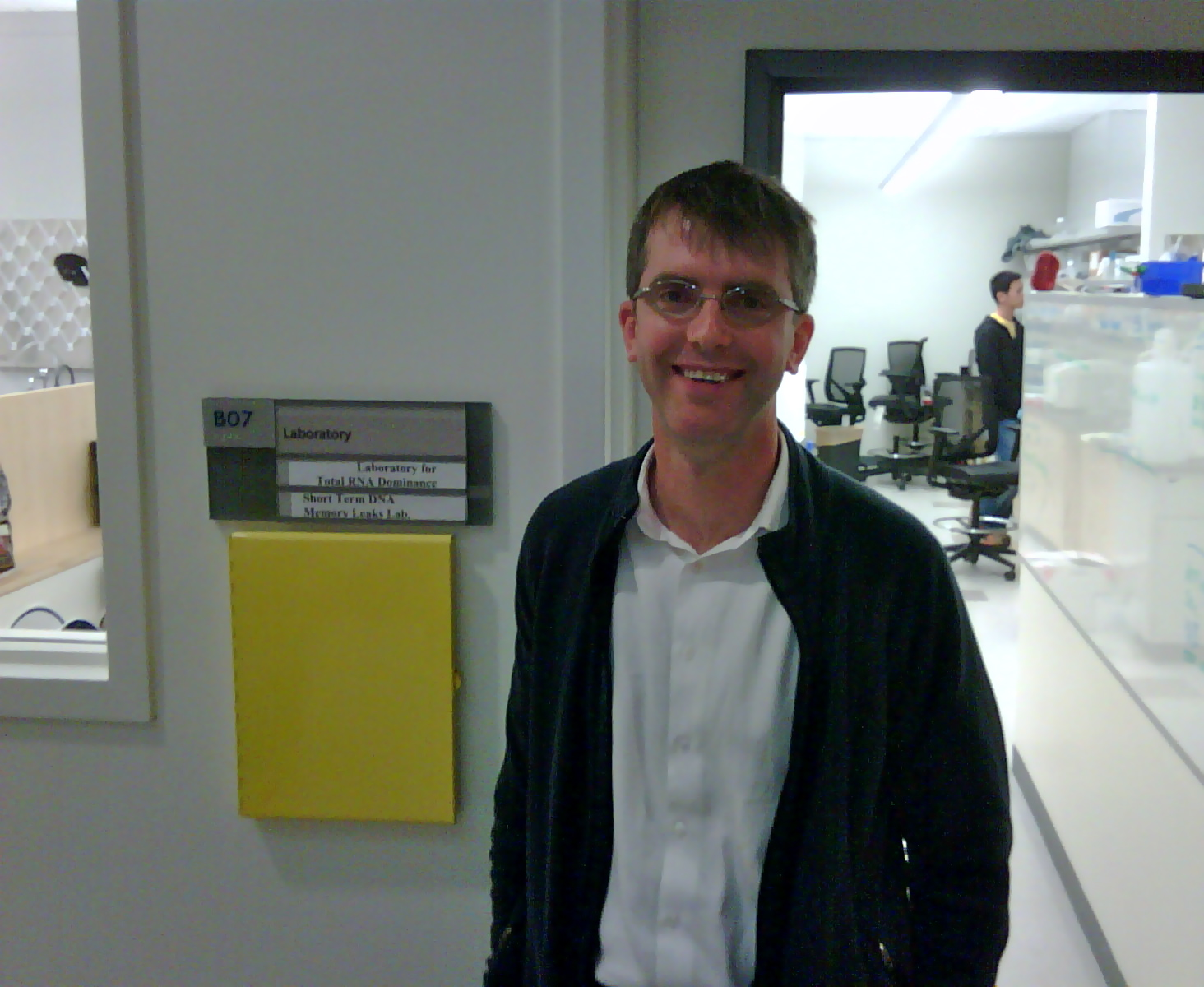
- Born: 1970 (age 55–56)
- Education: Dartmouth College
- Spouse: Christina Smolke
- Scientific career
- Fields: Synthetic biology
- Workplaces: Stanford University; Massachusetts Institute of Technology; Dartmouth College
- Thesis: Development and application of a genetically-structured simulation for bacteriophage T7 (1997)
- Doctoral advisor: John Yin
- Website: openwetware.org/wiki/Endy_Lab engineering.stanford.edu/people/drew-endy

Andrew David Endy (born 1970) is a synthetic biologist and associate professor of bioengineering at Stanford University and a senior fellow at the Hoover Institution

== Education and career ==
Endy received his bachelors and masters degrees from Lehigh University and his PhD from Dartmouth College in 1997 for his work on genetic engineering.

Endy was a junior fellow for three years and later an Assistant Professor of Biological Engineering at the Massachusetts Institute of Technology (2002–2008). In 2008, he moved to Stanford University, where he is an Associate Professor of Bioengineering.

=== Research ===
With Thomas Knight, Gerald Jay Sussman, Randy Rettberg and others at MIT, Endy worked on synthetic biology and the engineering of standardized biological components, devices, and parts, collectively known as BioBricks. Endy is one of several founders of the Registry of Standard Biological Parts, and invented an abstraction hierarchy for integrated genetic systems.

Endy was one of the early promoters of open source biology and helped start the Biobricks Foundation. He was also a co-founder of the now-defunct Codon Devices, a biotechnology startup company that aimed to commercialize synthetic biology.

In 2008, Esquire magazine named Endy one of the most influential people of the twenty-first century.

Endy led a team of researchers that in March 2013 created the biological equivalent of a transistor, which they dubbed a "transcriptor". The invention was the final of the three components required to build a functional biocomputer: data storage, information transmission, and a basic system of logic.

=== Federal service and policy work ===
Endy co-founded the iGEM competition. In 2013, Endy was recognized as a Champion of Change by the White House.

In February 2025, Endy testified before the U.S. China Economic and Security Review Commission. Endy is a founder and steering group member of the Build-a-Cell Initiative, an international collaboration investigating the creation of synthetic live cells.

== Personal life ==
Endy is married to Christina Smolke.
