= ILCD =

iLCD (Lighting Cell Display) is a device developed by a research team from Universidad Politecnica de Valencia, a MIT educated bioengineer, undergraduate students of the Universidad Politéctica de Valencia and Universitat de València and several members of the faculty and research staff from Universidad de València (Manuel Porcar), UPV (Pedro De Cordoba) and University of Malaga (Emilio Navarro).

It is based on yeast cells expressing aequorin protein sensitive to change in intracellular calcium. Upon electrical stimulation, the transient calcium wave emerges inside the yeast cells and translates into a measurable light signal. Assembly of multiple electrodes over lawn of yeast cells yields

Thanks to electronic control and sub-second timescale it is one of the first examples of bioelectronic devices capable of bi-directional communication between a computer and a living system. It is also one of the first examples of design of simple synthetic biology circuits operating on orders of magnitude faster timescale than those based on gene expression. Fast response to a stimulus is essential in variety of applications such as biosensing, medical technology, or as stated before - bioelectronics.

The project has been awarded a third place in 2009 iGEM competition
