= Applications of synthetic gene circuits in drug delivery =

Cell therapy technology applications

Synthetic gene circuits are a type of synthetic biological circuit in which gene transcription is controlled by logic gates. They are generally constructed with cellular signaling pathways that interact with biological signals, often ligands, to modify the transcription of particular genes via transcription factors. In the context of medicine, cells engineered with gene circuits can detect biomarkers present in their surroundings and respond by upregulating the production of a therapeutic protein encoded in the cell's genome.

Gene circuits allow for specific and localized release of therapeutics over time, which has applications in local pathologies such as cancerous tumors. The ability to continuously respond to changing extracellular conditions also makes them well suited for homeostatic pathologies like diabetes, autoimmune diseases, thyroid diseases, and psoriasis.

== Simple Boolean logic gene circuits ==
Logic gates in the form of signaling pathways responsive to a specific biomarker allow for precise targeting of disease spatially and as needed; these can take the form of AND gates to increase tissue specificity and reduce off-target effects.

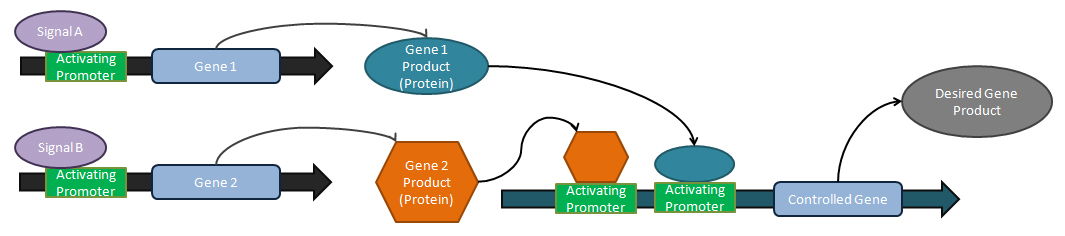
A depiction of how an AND logical gate may be applied in the context of cellular engineering.

=== Cancer ===
A limitation of antigen reliant therapies for cancer, such as CAR T cells, is that even tumor-specific antigens are not exclusively responsive to cancerous cells, which risks off-target effects on bystander tissue. Utilizing AND gate logic in cellular signaling requires multiple antigen signals to activate the downstream therapeutic effect, increasing tissue specificity. AND gate logic has been used in cells modified with a synthetic notch signaling pathway to enhance specificity in vitro.

=== Autoimmune disease ===
The autonomous and localized nature of gene circuit mediated therapeutic delivery is a useful property in autoimmune diseases where inflammation occurs intermittently. Circuit logic within continuously circulating therapeutic cells allows for better specificity in timing and location in comparison to traditional methods of drug delivery which act systemically. Timing of delivery is especially important in relapse-remittent immune disease to avoid over-exposure to anti-inflammatory therapeutics during relapse and ensure proper treatment when symptoms do occur. AND gated delivery of anti-inflammatory drugs using engineered cells has been shown to be effective at dynamically treating psoriatic symptoms in mouse models, both in vitro and in vivo, with high specificity to psoriasis biomarkers.

== Negative feedback gene circuits ==
Circuit logic also allows for the assembly of negative feedback within therapeutic cells. In diseases where tight homeostatic regulation is required for patient well-being or survival, this type of circuitry enables drug delivery to be autonomously mitigated so that homeostasis is maintained.

=== Diabetes ===
In diabetes, symptoms arise from an inability to maintain blood-glucose homeostasis. Traditional treatments aim to supply insulin during hyperglycemia to lower blood sugar, but they may cause hypoglycemia due to prolonged exposure. An approach using cells engineered with a negative feedback mechanism has shown effectiveness at supplying insulin in response to higher blood-glucose and did not cause hypoglycemic effects, as observed with traditional therapies.

=== Thyroid disease ===
Disruptions in levels of thyroid hormones can have downstream effects on other homeostatic systems, including metabolism and lipid functions. A common disfunction of the thyroid is Graves' Disease, in which thyroid hormones are elevated from basal levels, resulting in hyperthyroidism. Traditional treatment options can damage the thyroid and cause hypothyroidism. A cellular system with a closed-loop feedback circuit was developed to address these concerns; results indicated that the cells restored homeostatic control of thyroid hormone.

== See also ==
- Cell therapy
- Drug delivery
- Gene regulatory network
- Synthetic biology
