= Christina Smolke =

American biologist

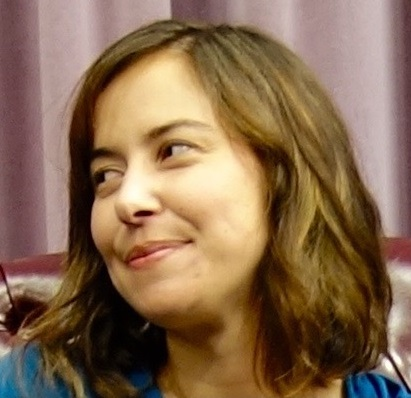
- Scientific career
- Fields: Synthetic biology
- Workplaces: Stanford University

External videos
- “Finding Medicine Where You Least Expect It”, Christina Smolke, TEDxStanford

Christina Smolke is an American synthetic biologist whose primary research is in the use of yeast to produce opioids for medical use. After graduating from California Institute of Technology and Stanford University, she aimed to program cells to synthesize complex molecules in 50-100 enzymatic steps, when most researchers only managed 2–3. She is a Full Professor of Bioengineering and of Chemical Engineering at Stanford University. She is the editor of The metabolic pathway engineering handbook (2010). She is an advisory board member for Integrative Biology. She is also the CEO and Cofounder of Antheia Bio, a bioengineering company.

== Biology research ==
Smolke and her laboratory team at Stanford University have pioneered work into the creation of a synthetic enzyme that converts reticuline, a key element of opioids. The process adds five genes from two different organisms to the yeast cells. Three of these genes come from the poppy, and the others from a bacterium that lives on poppy plant stalks. They produced the first narcotic using synthetic biology.

Smolke has also done work on cancer cells with Maung Nyan Win, designing molecules from RNA that can identify biomarkers in the cellular state of diseased cells. Such molecules could act as computational devices within the cell, detecting states and determining whether or not to carry out a particular action. They have the potential to be used in "smart" drug delivery systems, to ensure that healthy cells will not be affected by treatments. Potential applications are being investigated at the City of Hope Cancer Center.

== Awards ==
- SynBioBeta Award for “Most Promising New Synthetic Biology Startup”, 1st Annual Engineering Biology Awards (2015)
- National Institutes of Health Director's Pioneer Award (2012)
- World Technology Award in Biotechnology by the World Technology Network (2009)
- Alfred P. Sloan Foundation Fellow, Alfred P. Sloan Foundation (2008)
- National Science Foundation CAREER Award, National Science Foundation (2006)
- Beckman Young Investigator Award, Arnold and Mabel Beckman Foundation (2005)
- 35 Innovators Under 35, MIT Technology Review (2004)

== Selected publications ==
- Metabolic Pathway Engineering Handbook (2 volumes), CRC Press. 2009. ISBN 978-0849339233
- Stephanie Galanie1, Kate Thodey2, Isis J. Trenchard2, Maria Filsinger Interrante2, Christina D. Smolke2. Complete biosynthesis of opioids in yeast. Science 4 September 2015: Vol. 349 no. 6252 pp. 1095-1100 DOI: 10.1126/science.aac9373
- Win, Maung Nyan; Smolke, Christina D. (2008). "Higher-order cellular information processing with synthetic RNA devices". Science. 322 (5900): 456–460. Bibcode:2008Sci...322..456W. doi:10.1126/science.1160311. PMC 2805114. PMID 18927397.
- Pfleger, Brian F.; et al. (2006). "Combinatorial engineering of intergenic regions in operons tunes expression of multiple genes". Nature Biotechnology. 24 (8): 1027–1032. Bibcode:2006NatBi..24.1027P. doi:10.1038/nbt1226. PMID 16845378. S2CID 35290951.
- Bayer, Travis S.; Smolke, Christina D. (2005). "Programmable ligand-controlled riboregulators of eukaryotic gene expression". Nature Biotechnology. 23 (3): 337–343. doi:10.1038/nbt1069. PMID 15723047. S2CID 8655034.
- Win, Maung Nyan; Smolke, Christina D. (2007). "A modular and extensible RNA-based gene-regulatory platform for engineering cellular function". Proceedings of the National Academy of Sciences. 104 (36): 14283–14288. doi:10.1073/pnas.0703961104. PMC 1964840. PMID 17709748.
