= Brian Pfleger =

American academic

Academic background
- Education: BS, Chemical Engineering, Cornell University; PhD, Chemical Engineering, University of California, Berkeley
- Website: https://pflegerlab.che.wisc.edu/

Brian F. Pfleger is the Karen and William Monfre Professor and Vilas Distinguished Achievement Professor of Chemical Engineering at the University of Wisconsin–Madison. Currently, he is the R. Byron Bird Department Chair.

== Early life and education ==
Pfleger received his bachelor's degree in chemical engineering from the R.F. Smith School of Chemical and Biomolecular Engineering at Cornell University and his Ph.D. in chemical engineering from the University of California, Berkeley. During his PhD, he worked with Jay Keasling. Pfleger's doctoral research focused on creating methods to control gene expression in bacteria. This work was crucial for optimizing resource allocation in engineered strains fir synthesizing pharmaceuticals, notably contributing to the development of Escherichia coli strains that could synthesize precursors to artemisinin, and antimalarial terpene.

Subsequently, Pfleger received a postdoctoral fellowship from the NIH Great Lakes Regional Center of Excellence for Biodefense and Emerging Infectious Diseases Research. With the fellowship, he joined David H. Sherman's lab at the University of Michigan, where he broadened his expertise in the biosynthesis of polyketides and non-ribosomal peptides. His residency involved studying how six Bacillus anthracis enzymes assemble a natural product essential for iron acquisition and pathogenesis.

== Career ==
In the summer of 2007, Pfleger joined the faculty as an assistant professor at the college of engineering of the University of Wisconsin–Madison. He was promoted to the rank of associate professor in 2013 and full professor in 2017.

As an assistant professor, he received the National Science Foundation CAREER Award to support his research converting biomass into high-energy-density hydrocarbon fuels using a more sustainable, cost-effective processes. Additionally, he won 3m's Nontenured Faculty Award, and in 2010, he received early career support with $1 million over a 3-5 year range as part of the Air Force Young Investigator Research Program through the Air Force Office of Scientific Research. He also won the United States Department of Energy Early Career Award, a five-year, $750,000 award, for his research to improve microorganism that can sustainably produce fuels and chemicals.

As an associate professor, Pfleger won the Biotechnology and Bioengineering Daniel I.C. Wang Award, and the Society of Industrial Microbiology and Biotechnology (SIMB) Young Investigator Award.

During his tenure at UW–Madison, Pfleger's research focuses on developing sustainable methods for chemical production using renewable resources like biomass or by harnessing solar energy to convert carbon dioxide into chemical, aiming for a closed carbon cycle. His work utilizes synthetic biology, which combines engineering, math, chemistry, and biology to engineer microbial systems for sustainable chemical production. The research is broadly categorized into four areas: component discovery and characterization, tool development, metabolic engineering, and systems biology. All contribute to generating products from renewable resources. This approach seeks to replace the current fossil fuel-based chemical industry with environmentally sustainable alternatives.

In May 2021, project Acetate as a Platform for Carbon-Negative Production of Renewable Fuels and Chemicals, led by Pfleger, received almost $3.5 million in funding from the Department of Energy's advanced Research Projects Agency-Energy. The goal is to investigate methods for producing carbon-negative chemicals by using unique microorganisms.

Pfleger was appointed a Vilas Distinguished Achievement Professor of Chemical and Biological Engineering in 2023.

In January 2025, Pfleger was a part of a team at the University of Wisconsin-Madison that received a $1.3 million grant from the W.M. Keck Foundation. Their project aims to explore the nitrogenase enzyme behind the origins and early evolution of life on Earth. Nitrogenase has persisted through upheavals in atmospheric chemistry and surface temperatures over Earth's history. By combining paleontology, artificial intelligence, synthetic biology and evolution, the team of scientists, they will attempt to understand more than three billion years of molecular diversity to determine where this enzyme came from, how it functions and how it has adapted and evolved throughout Earth's history.
