= Registry of Standard Biological Parts =

The Registry of Standard Biological Parts is a collection of genetic parts that are used in the assembly of systems and devices in synthetic biology. The registry was founded in 2003 by iGEM at the Massachusetts Institute of Technology. The registry, as of 2026, contains over 84,000 parts. Recipients of the genetic parts include academic labs, established scientists, and teams participating in the annual iGEM Competition.

The Registry of Standard Biological Parts conforms to the BioBrick format, a standard for interchangeable genetic parts that was developed by iGEM. The Registry offers genetic parts with the expectation that recipients will contribute data and new parts to improve the resource. The registry records and indexes biological parts and offers services including the synthesis and assembly of biological parts, systems, and devices.

The Registry offers many types of biological parts, including DNA, plasmids, plasmid backbones, primers, promoters, protein coding sequences, protein domains, ribosomal binding sites, terminators, translational units, riboregulators, and composite parts. It also includes devices such as protein generators, reporters, inverters, receptors, senders, and measurement devices. A key idea that motivated the development of the Registry was to develop an abstraction hierarchy implemented through the parts categorization system.

The Registry has previously received external funding through grants from the National Science Foundation, the Defense Advanced Research Projects Agency, and the National Institutes of Health.

== See also ==
- Synthetic biology
