= Biological patent =

Patent on an invention in the field of biology

A biological patent is a patent on an invention in the field of biology that by law allows the patent holder to exclude others from making, using, selling, or importing the protected invention for a limited period of time. The scope and reach of biological patents vary among jurisdictions, and may include biological technology and products, genetically modified organisms and genetic material. The applicability of patents to substances and processes wholly or partially natural in origin is a subject of debate.

== Biological patents in different jurisdictions ==
=== Australia ===
In February 2013, Judge Justice John Nicholas ruled in the Federal Court of Australia in favour of a Myriad Genetics patent on the BRCA1 gene. This was a landmark ruling, affirming the validity of patents on naturally occurring DNA sequences. However, the U.S. Supreme Court came to the opposite conclusion only a few months later. The Australian ruling has been appealed to the Full Bench of the Federal Court; submissions in the case include consideration of the U.S. Supreme Court ruling. This decision was decided in 2014, affirming Nicholas J's decision in favor of Myriad, confirming that isolated genetic material (genes) are valid subjects of patents. In October 2015, the High Court of Australia ruled that naturally occurring genes cannot be patented.

=== Canada ===
Per Canada's Patent Act, patents are granted by the Canadian Intellectual Property Office (CIPO). Patents will only be granted for "any new and useful art, process, machine, manufacture or composition of matter", and improvements thereon. Patents will not be granted for “mere scientific principle or abstract theorem.” In the case of pharmaceuticals, along with obtaining a patent, applicants must also seek approval from Health Canada. This process is governed by the Patented Medicines (Notice of Compliance) Regulations.

In Harvard College v Canada (Commissioner of Patents), also referred to as the oncomouse case, the Supreme Court of Canada ruled that higher life forms were not patentable subject matter. The OncoMouse was one of the first transgenic mice developed for use in cancer research, and the first mammal to be the subject of a patent application. Writing for the majority, Bastarache J. asserted that it was the role of Parliament to address whether higher life forms should be patentable. In contrast, the United States Patent & Trademark Office issued the patents covering methods for providing a cell culture from a transgenic non-human anima to Harvard College. The patent was also allowed in Europe before eventually being revoked in 2006 for a failure to pay fees and file translations. Although animals cannot be patented, Canada allows for the patent of antibodies obtained through immunizing animals.

Methods of medical treatment cannot be patented in Canada, however, medical use claims such as the use of an antibody for the treatment of a particular disease is patentable. Further, antigens which have not been previously characterized are also patentable.

Gene patents confer a property right to the patent holder. While CIPO will grant patents for isolated gDNA and cDNA, the Supreme Court of Canada has not yet ruled on gene patentability. However, in 2016 the Children's Hospital of Eastern Ontario (CHEO) sought to invalidate five Canadian patents held by Transgenomic. The gene patents covered the genes associated with, and genetic testing for Long QT syndrome. The parties reached a settlement. The patent was not invalidated, but, Transgenomic provided Canadian health institutions the right to test Canadians for the disease on a non-profit basis. In Association for Molecular Pathology v Myriad, the United States Supreme Court determined that genes were unpatentable products of nature and that no intellectual property existed as nothing was invented. Given this decision, the majority of Canadian Long QT syndrome tests were previously outsourced to the United States. After the settlement, domestic testing levels increased in Canada. The terms of the settlement could set a precedent for the repatriation of further genetic testing.

=== Europe ===
European Union directive 98/44/EC (the Biotech Directive) reconciled the legislation of biological patents among certain countries under the jurisdiction of the European Patent Organisation. It allows for the patenting of natural biological products, including gene sequences, as long as they are "isolated from [their] natural environment or produced by means of a technical process."

The European Patent Office has ruled that European patents cannot be granted for processes that involve the destruction of human embryos.

In the case of the oncomouse, the European Patent Office (EPO) allowed for the patent. The EPO's patent standards prohibits patents for inventions contrary to ordre public and morality. Patents also could not be issued for “animal varieties or essentially biological processes for the production of…animals”. The EPO undertook a utilitarian balancing test to make their determination on the ordre public and morality exceptions. They found that the likelihood of advancing cancer research and medical benefits outweighed potential suffering of the animal. The EPO also determined that the oncomouse was not an animal variety, and thus not excluded. An amended patent with claims limited to mice was issued.

=== Japan ===
Under the umbrella of biotechnology, applications for patents on biological inventions are examined according to general guidelines for patents. In response to requests for additional clarity, the Japan Patent Office (JPO) set forth specific guidelines for biology-related inventions. Over the years, the JPO has continued to amend these guidelines to clarify their application to new technologies. These amendments have broadened the scope of patents within the biotechnology industry. The Japanese Patent Act requires that patented inventions be “industrially applicable”, i.e. they must have market or commercial potential. The JPO explicitly lists “medical activities” among inventions that fall outside the scope of industrially applicable inventions, meaning that methods of surgery, therapy, and the diagnosis of human diseases cannot be patented.

=== United States ===
In the United States, up until 2013 natural biological substances themselves could have been patented (apart from any associated process or usage) if they were sufficiently "isolated" from their naturally occurring states. Prominent historical examples of such patents include those on adrenaline, insulin, vitamin B_{12}, and various genes. A landmark ruling by the U.S. Supreme Court in June 2013 declared naturally occurring DNA sequences ineligible for patents.

== Ethics ==
=== Patenting genes ===
Gene patents are a form of intellectual property which provide the patent holder with the exclusive right to exclude others from making, using, selling, or importing the invention for a specified period of time, typically twenty years.

The patenting of genes is a controversial issue in terms of bioethics. Some believe it is unethical to patent genetic material because it treats life as a commodity, or that it undermines the dignity of people and animals by allowing ownership of genes. Some say that living materials occur naturally, and therefore cannot be patented. Along with concerns about the commodification of human life, the medical community has also warned that gene patents can inhibit the practice of medicine and progress of science. For example, the American Medical Association's stance is that gene patents inhibit access to genetic testing for patients and hinder research on genetic disease. A contrary position is that forbidding patents on biotechnological innovations would also be unethical. Supporters of this idea suggest that patents allow the public, as well as policy makers, to hold the owner of the patent(s) accountable. They favour biological patents because they require disclosure of information to the public.

Agreements such as the Agreement on Trade-related Aspects of Intellectual Property Rights (TRIPS) require members of the World Trade Organization (WTO) to have intellectual property protection laws in place for most biological innovation. The cost of research and development for innovations such as biologics is extremely high. Such protection regimes help to protect innovators from free-riders. Based on these provisions, it is unlikely that many countries will prohibit patents on genes altogether.

Another area of controversy in genetic patenting is how gene samples are obtained. Prior consent is required to collect genetic samples, and collection of samples from people requires consent at the national and community levels as well as the individual level. Conflicts have resulted when consent is not obtained at all three levels. The question of benefit sharing also arises when obtaining genetic samples, specifically the potential responsibility of the collector to share any benefits or profits of the discoveries with the population or person from whom the sample came.

The last major ethical issue involving gene patents is how the patents are used post-issuance. The use of patented materials and processes will be very expensive or even prohibited to some degree by conditions the patent owner sets. Limiting access like this would directly impact agricultural institutes and university researchers, among others. There is potential that holders of biotechnology patents will exploit their rights in order to make larger profits, at the potential expense of farmers, healthcare patients, and other users of patented technologies. The ethics of using patents to increase profits are also debated. A typical argument in favour of biotech patents is that they enable companies to earn money that the companies in turn invest in further research. Without these patents, some worry that companies would no longer have the resources or motives to perform competitive, viable biotech research.

=== Patents relating to the diagnosis, treatment and prevention of COVID-19 ===
In light of the COVID-19 pandemic, several companies around the world raced to develop testing, vaccines, and cures for COVID-19. This required a substantial investment of time and money, and patents were used to protect this innovation. Patent holders are able to refuse licensing for third-parties to manufacture the patented medicine, creating a monopoly for the patent holder and lower supply levels. Furthermore, patent-holders control pricing for licensing and access. This patent-regime has the potential to limit access to life-saving vaccines and cures, especially for those in poor countries. Pharmaceutical industry executives diminished the idea of sharing intellectual property, arguing that companies would have no incentive to innovate if their patents were considered worthless during a pandemic. However, health advocates argue that taxpayers substantially contributed to the development of the vaccines and they should thus be regarded as global public goods.

A lack of access to medication and vaccines is especially problematic during a global pandemic. In April 2020, the Director General of the World Health Organization supported a proposal by Carlos Alvarado, to create a pool of rights for testing medicine and vaccine with free access or affordable licensing terms for all countries. He asked all companies, countries, and research institutions to support “open data, open science, and open collaboration.” He warned that poorer countries would be the hardest hit by the pandemic and failure to assist could prolong the pandemic.

Instead, patent-holders have undertaken case-by-case negotiations to form exclusive licensing contracts. This approach is criticized by the global health community as being too slow, especially where variants are concerned. Further, some poor countries such as South Africa paid more per dose for vaccines than rich countries and the European Union.

One potential remedy is for States to implement compulsory patent licenses. These licenses give the State power to grant permission to third parties to formulate generic versions of the medicine for use in that state. This is beneficial to states with lesser buying power. However, such initiatives are not popular with industry. In March 2020, Israel became the first country to issue a COVID-19 related compulsory license under Section 104 of the Patent Statute. This provision allowed Israel to undermine the patent regime for national defence purposes. No consultation with the patent-holder is required and there is no right for judicial review. The permit allowed Israel to import a generic version of Kaletra from India to treat COVID patients. Canada's Bill C-13, which came into force in March 2020, allows the Commissioner of Patents to allow the country to produce, sell, and use a patented invention if the Federal Minister of Health deems there to be a public health emergency. Although no consultation with patent-holders is required, the country will compensate them with an amount “the Commissioner considers to be adequate remuneration in the circumstances.” Germany also has allowed its Federal Health Minister to take executive action to make medicines available in return for adequate compensation. France amended their patent law to preclude the need for amicable negotiations with patent-holders where urgency exists.

These issues may also be addressed through use of voluntary licensing proposals. Alternatively, public pressure on patent holders may play a significant role. For example, Labrador Diagnostics LLC, which purchased patents from the defunct Theranos, brought an action, and sought an injunction against BioFire Diagnostics for making COVID-19 diagnostic tests. The action was abandoned after public backlash.

== See also ==
- Bioprospecting and biopiracy
- Budapest Treaty
- Copyright status of genetic sequences
- Human Genome Project
- The Lens
