= Open synthetic biology =

Open synthetic biology is the idea that scientific knowledge and data should be openly accessible through common rights licensing to enable the rapid development of safe, effective and commercially viable synthetic biology applications.

== Concepts ==
Its foundational concepts are open science and the Bermuda Principles. Open science is the idea that scientific research should be openly shared to enable massive collaboration (e.g., the Polymath Project). The Bermuda Principles is a private accord declaring that all DNA sequence data should be released in publicly accessible databases within 24 hours after generation.

Open synthetic biology is a theoretical framework supporting a global ecosystem of responsible and capable research scientists working collaboratively on synthetic biology application development projects to reduce cost, time, and risks of developing new synthetic biology applications (including open synthetic biology therapeutics) from the inception of primary science to applications reaching market readiness and commercial viability.

Its general principle is that participating research scientists agree to share research, data, findings and results with the open synthetic biology community and the public generally. The Open SynBio community will set standards and expectations of the participants and their "science to market" process and the community will work collaboratively with downstream stakeholders (e.g., investors and business advisors) to ensure public safety and general availability of new synthetic biology applications.

== Examples ==
One example of open synthetic biology is when DNA2.0 donated several artificial gene sequences into an open-access repository run by the BioBricks Foundation.
