= Tom Knight (scientist) =

American synthetic biologist

- Education: Massachusetts Institute of Technology
- Scientific career
- Fields: Synthetic biology
- Workplaces: MIT Computer Science and Artificial Intelligence Laboratory

Tom Knight is an American synthetic biologist and computer engineer, who was formerly a senior research scientist at the MIT Computer Science and Artificial Intelligence Laboratory, a part of the MIT School of Engineering. He now works at the synthetic biology company Ginkgo Bioworks, which he cofounded in 2008.

== Career ==
=== Work in electrical engineering and computer science ===
Tom Knight arrived at MIT when he was fourteen. Even though he only started his undergraduate studies at the regular age of 18, he took classes in computer programming and organic chemistry during high school because he lived close to the university. He built early hardware such as ARPANET interfaces for host #6 on the network, some of the first bitmapped displays, the ITS time sharing system, Lisp machines (he was also instrumental in releasing a version of the operating system for the Lisp machine under a BSD license), the Connection Machine, and parallel symbolic processing computer systems.

In 1967 Knight wrote the original kernel for the ITS operating system, as well as the combination of command processor and debugger that was used as its top-level user interface. ITS was the dominant operating system for first Project MAC and later the MIT Artificial Intelligence Laboratory and MIT Laboratory for Computer Science. ITS ran on PDP-6 and, later, PDP-10 computers.

In 1968, Knight designed and supervised the construction of the first PDP-10 ARPANET interfaces with Bob Metcalfe.

Knight developed a system to use standard television sets as a terminal interface to the PDP-10.

In 1972, Knight designed one of the first semiconductor memory-based bitmap displays. This was later commercialized and led directly to the development of the Bedford Computer Systems newspaper layout system and influenced many of the bitmapped display devices available today. That same year, along with Jeff Rubin, Knight designed and implemented a network file system that provided the first transparent remote file access over the ARPANET.

In 1974, Knight designed and implemented the prototype version of the MIT Lisp Machine processor, with the production version following in 1976. The Lisp Machine was a microprogrammed machine, tuned for high-performance emulation of other instruction sets. The design of the Lisp Machine was directly implemented by both Symbolics and LMI and was the basis of all of their computers. Texas Instruments implemented surface mount and single-chip versions of the architecture in 1983 and 1987, respectively.

Knight collaborated with Jack Holloway in designing and implementing the Chaosnet, a re-engineered version of the Xerox 3 Mbit/s Ethernet. In 1975 this network became the first local area network on MIT's campus. Chaosnet's innovation of a preamble bit string for packets was eventually incorporated into the 10 Mbit/s Ethernet standard.

In 1980, Knight participated in the development of the Connection Machine architecture and its original implementation. Other notable and diverse accomplishments during the 1980s included the creation of the first silicon retina in 1981, the creation of a single-chip optical mouse, the design of the Cross-Omega interconnection network architecture, and the design of the Transit multiprocessor interconnection architecture.

During the early 1990s, Knight was involved in the formation of Permabit and of Exa Corporation and the architecture of the latter's initial version of its FX/1 lattice gas parallel fluid flow computer. Advances included using over-relaxation techniques to make 10x algorithmic improvements in lattice gas computations, landmark CFD accuracies, and correction of misconceptions about the origin of fluid turbulence in simple two-dimensional flow situations. Within the Artificial Intelligence Laboratory, he led the Abacus SIMD project, worked on VLSI micro displays, and made advances in the field of adiabatic (reversible) computing.

=== Work in synthetic biology ===
It was also during this period that Knight's interests in biological systems began. Inspired in part by the work of Harold J. Morowitz, a Yale physicist and biologist, Knight studied biochemistry, genetics, and cellular biology, and set up a biology lab within the MIT AI Laboratory. In this lab he created the concept of the BioBrick plasmid DNA part and began creating a library of BioBricks that could be used to simplify the genetic engineering of Escherichia coli cells. Today, BioBricks form the basis of the enormous annual iGEM (International Genetically Engineered Machine) competition and Knight is sometimes referred to as the godfather of synthetic biology. Knight co-founded Ginkgo Bioworks, a synthetic biology company. Ginkgo Bioworks went public in 2021.
