= International Genetically Engineered Machine =

International competition

iGEM
- Locations: Paris, France (2022~); Boston, Massachusetts, United States (2003-2019); With additional events worldwide
- Organiser: iGEM Foundation
- Website: igem.org

iGEM is an international not-for-profit organization dedicated to advancing the field of synthetic biology (also known as synbio) and building the global synbio workforce through education and competition.

Originating from a month-long course at MIT in 2003, today, over 100,000 individuals (referred to as “iGEMers”) have engaged with iGEM from across the globe.

iGEM operates programs across multiple dimensions of the synthetic biology sector, with initiatives including iGEM Competition, iGEM Villages, iGEM Community, iGEM Responsibility, iGEM Technology, and iGEM Innovation.

== History of iGEM ==
In 2003, iGEM was first initiated as a month-long intercessional course at MIT for students to explore the intersection between biology and engineering. Led by Tom Knight, Drew Endy, and Randy Rettberg, students were challenged to design and build living systems in a systematic, and engineering-driven way. At a time when engineering and biology were two separate disciplines, iGEM pioneered a new field - synthetic biology.

In 2004, iGEM expanded with five teams from various schools in the United States taking part and competing with the systems that they designed. This marked the first iteration of the iGEM Competition. In 2005, the iGEM Competition continued to gain traction with international teams taking part for the first time. In response to continual growth in the years following, the iGEM Foundation was spun out of MIT as an independent non-profit organization in 2012.

As an organization, the iGEM Foundation now covers initiatives across a range of dimensions in synthetic biology including responsibility, technology, and innovation, each with a respective iGEM Program. To date, the iGEM Competition remains a core component of the iGEM Foundation’s contributions to the synthetic biology field with 463 global teams enrolled in the 2026 iGEM Competition.

As of 2026, there have been over 5550 teams registered in the Competition’s history and over 115,084 iGEMers.

== iGEM Programs ==
=== iGEM Competition ===
The iGEM Competition is an annual synthetic biology competition open to undergraduate, postgraduate, and high school student teams worldwide. During the Competition, multidisciplinary teams work together to design, build, test, and measure a genetically engineered system that responds to a defined real-world problem.

To build these systems, all teams use molecular biology techniques to work with a standardised DNA Distribution Kit containing a curated set of biological parts, and the team’s choice of interchangeable biological parts termed “BioBricks”. The BioBricks used by teams are listed on the iGEM Registry of Standard Biological Parts - an open source, community-curated collection which teams contribute new parts to each year. As of 2026, the iGEM Registry of Standard Biological Parts has over 84,000 documented parts listed thus far, with over 9000 new contributions per year.

Judging & Awards

At the end of the Competition season, teams from across the world convene at the iGEM Grand Jamboree to showcase their projects and discuss their contributions. During the Grand Jamboree, teams members present their learnings, meet with the global community, and attend judging sessions to evaluate the accomplishments of their projects.

Each year, over 400 judges are selected to assess and score teams based on the engineering success, contributions, and potential impact of their projects. Judges are selected based on their expertise and knowledge in synthetic biology.

From the judging evaluation, teams are eligible for a variety of awards including Medals to celebrate excellence; Project Awards which acknowledge team ranking in the overall Competition, track, and Village; and Special Awards in commendation of specific project dimensions.

=== iGEM Villages ===
Reflecting the way that iGEM projects respond to challenges in the real world, teams are categorised, showcased, and judged according to thematic Villages. The iGEM Villages include: Agriculture; Bioremediation; Climate Crisis; Conservation; Fashion & Cosmetics; Food & Nutrition; Diagnostics; Infectious Diseases; Oncology; Therapeutics; Art & Design; Biomanufacturing; Foundational Advance; Software & AI; Space.

=== iGEM Grand Jamboree ===
The iGEM Grand Jamboree - the World Expo of Synthetic Biology - is a four-day convention that convenes synthetic biologists across research, innovation, industry, and governance.

The Grand Jamboree hosts a number of initiatives covering current topics in synthetic biology. These include:

- iGEM Competition
- Responsibility Conference
- BioInnovation Summit

History of the iGEM Jamboree

Originating as a means to convene teams at the end of the iGEM Competition season, the first Jamboree was held in 2004 at MIT with a total of five teams in attendance. By 2011, in response to the international traction of the Competition, the Jamboree was split into three regions (Europe; the Americas; and Asia), with the top performing regional teams selected to attend a World Championship at MIT.

By 2014, the number of teams participating had grown to 245, leading iGEM to move from regional Jamborees to an annual conference in Boston, renamed as the “Giant Jamboree”.

In response to the COVID-19 pandemic, the 2020 and 2021 Giant Jamborees were hosted online.

After surpassing 350 teams registered in 2022, the Jamboree was renamed to the “Grand Jamboree” and moved to a new location - the Paris Expo Porte de Versailles.

=== iGEM Technology ===
iGEM Technology aims to vet new technologies and resources for synthetic biology as part of the iGEM Competition. It also includes the iGEM Registry, resources for engineering and standardization, and strategic partnerships aiming to advance synbio research.

=== iGEM Responsibility ===
The iGEM Responsibility Program enables safe and secure use of synthetic biology, with the aim of creating insights with global policy implications.

=== iGEM Innovation ===
In response to the growing impact of iGEMers across industry, iGEM Innovation was initiated as a program to support the full innovation chain from breakthroughs in scientific research to commercialised technologies that have been deployed to the market at scale.

Support for early-stage innovation and venture creation

Recognising the high potential for iGEM projects to form the basis of a commercial venture and the interest of iGEMers in entrepreneurship, the iGEM Venture Foundry was established as an initiative to train, educate, and build a community around the early stages of bioentrepreneurship.

The iGEM Venture Foundry is a 6-month entrepreneurship exploration course designed as a sandbox for iGEMers to experiment with venture creation for innovations in synthetic biology.

The Venture Foundry begins with a 4-week Venture Creation Lab course which covers the foundations of entrepreneurship and the nuances of venture creation in the synthetic biology industry. During the Venture Creation Lab, participants attend lectures, speaker seminars, and prepare for a final Demo Day where they pitch and compete with their idea for a synthetic biology venture. Following this, promising teams from each cohort are selected to engage with further mentorship and pitching opportunities.

Ecosystem Supporters Catalogue

iGEM Innovation operates and maintains the Ecosystem Supporters Catalogue - a global index of early-stage investors, accelerators, and incubators that serve the synthetic biology sector.

As of 2026, there are over 515 Ecosystem Supporters listed in the Catalogue.

Industry and innovation at scale

To support the later stages of innovation including market entry and operation at scale, iGEM Innovation hosts initiatives including the BioInnovation Summit and BioVisionaries series.

These initiatives aim to provide a platform for industry leaders to share and generate insights into the challenges and tactics for successful deployment of synthetic biology innovations in industry.

=== iGEM Community ===
The iGEM Community Program aims to support the growing network of 100,000+ iGEMers, and to further develop the synthetic biology ecosystem worldwide. Through a range of locally-focussed initiatives, iGEM Community provides resources and opportunities for professional growth in the synthetic biology field.
