= BioBrick =

Standard for components used in DNA synthesis

Synthetic Biology Open Language (SBOL) standard visual symbols for use with BioBricks Standard

BioBrick parts are DNA sequences which conform to a restriction-enzyme assembly standard. These building blocks are used to design and assemble larger synthetic biological circuits from individual parts and combinations of parts with defined functions, which would then be incorporated into living cells such as Escherichia coli cells to construct new biological systems. Examples of BioBrick parts include promoters, ribosomal binding sites (RBS), coding sequences and terminators.

== Overview ==
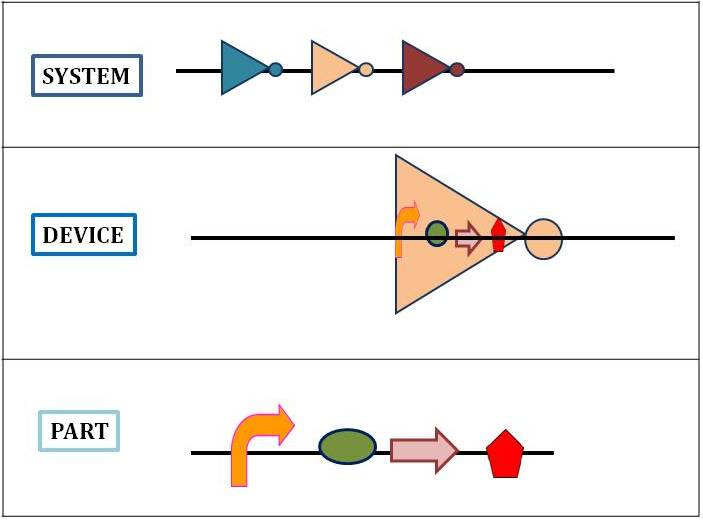
Abstraction hierarchy allows the breakdown of complexity.

The BioBrick parts are used by applying engineering principles of abstraction and modularization. BioBrick parts form the base of the hierarchical system on which synthetic biology is based. There are three levels to the hierarchy:

1. Parts: Pieces of DNA that form a functional unit (for example promoter, RBS, etc.)
2. Device: Collection set of parts with defined function. In simple terms, a set of complementary BioBrick parts put together forms a device.
3. System: Combination of a set of devices that performs high-level tasks.

The development of standardized biological parts allows for the rapid assembly of sequences. The ability to test individual parts and devices to be independently tested and characterized also improves the reliability of higher-order systems.

== History ==
The first attempt to create a list of standard biological parts was in 1996, by Rebatchouk et al. This team introduced a cloning strategy for the assembly of short DNA fragments. However, this early attempt was not widely recognised by the scientific research community at the time. In 1999, Arkin and Endy realized that the heterogeneous elements that made up a genetic circuit were lacking standards, so they proposed a list of standard biological parts. BioBricks were described and introduced by Tom Knight at MIT in 2003. Since then, various research groups have utilized the BioBrick standard parts to engineer novel biological devices and systems.

=== BioBricks Foundation ===
The BioBricks Foundation was formed in 2006 by engineers and scientists alike as a not-for-profit organization to standardize biological parts across the field. The Foundation focuses on improving in areas of Technology, Law, Education and the Global Community as they apply to synthetic biology. BioBricks Foundation's activities include hosting SBx.0 Conferences, technical and educational programs. The SBx.0 conferences are international conferences on synthetic biology hosted across the world. Technical programs are aimed at the production of a series of standard biological parts, and their education expansion is creating acts which help create open, standardized sources of biological parts.

=== BioBricks Public Agreement ===
As an alternative to traditional biotechnology patent systems and in an effort to allow BioBricks to be utilized as an open-source community standard, the BioBricks Foundation created the BioBrick Public Agreement, which consists of a Contributor Agreement and a User Agreement. Those who want to give a part to the community sign the Contributor Agreement, agreeing not to assert against Users Contributor-held intellectual property rights that might limit the use of the contributed materials. Signers of the User Agreement may freely use the whole collection of parts given by contributors. There is no requirement for users to contribute to the community in order to use the parts, and users may assert intellectual property rights to inventions developed by using the parts. The User Agreement allows users to establish invention of uses of parts, to disclose patents on parts combinations, and to freely build on the contributions of other users.

== BioBrick Assembly standard ==
The BioBrick assembly standard was introduced to overcome the lack of standardization posed by traditional molecular cloning methods. The BioBrick assembly standard is a more reliable approach for combining parts to form larger composites. The assembly standard enables two groups of synthetic biologists in different parts of the world to re-use a BioBrick part without going through the whole cycle of design and manipulation. This means the newly designed part can be used by other teams of researchers more easily. Besides that, when compared to the old-fashioned ad hoc cloning method, the assembly standard process is faster and promotes automation. The BioBrick assembly standard 10 was the first assembly standard to be introduced. Over the years, several other assembly standards, such as the Biofusion standard and Freiburg standard have been developed.

=== BioBrick assembly standard 10 ===
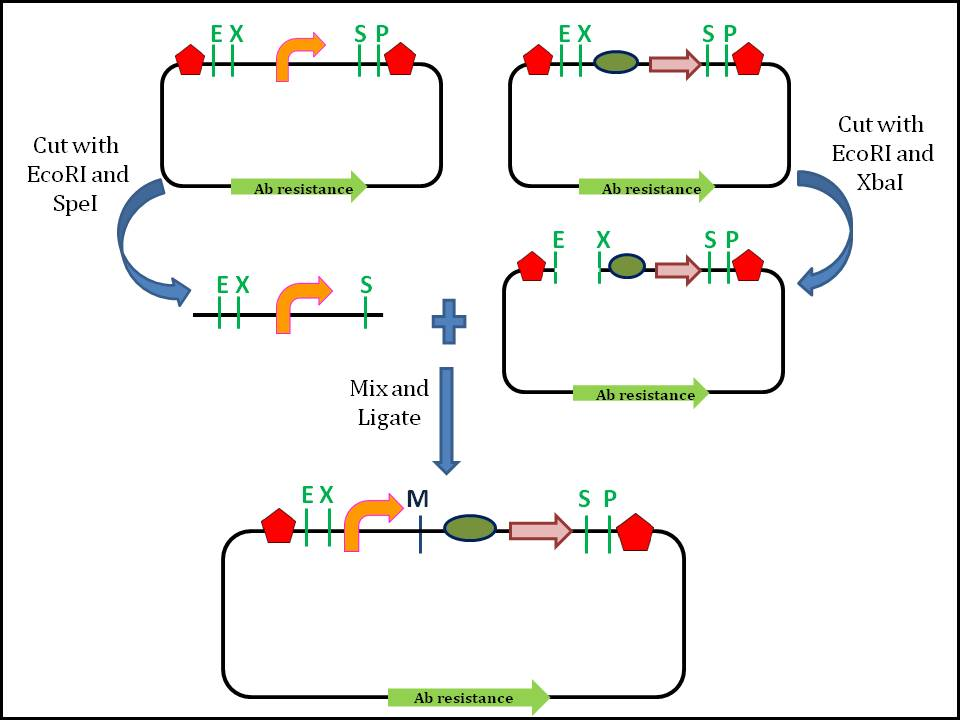
Standard assembly of two BioBrick parts (promoter and coding sequence) by digestion and ligation which forms a "scar" site(M).

Assembly standard 10 was developed by Tom Knight, and is the most widely used assembly standard. It involves the use of restriction enzymes. Every BioBrick part is a DNA sequence which is carried by a circular plasmid, which acts as a vector. The vector acts as a transport system to carry the BioBrick parts. The first approach towards a BioBrick standard was the introduction of standard sequences, the prefix and suffix sequences, which flank the 5′ and 3′ ends of the DNA part respectively. These standard sequences encode specific restriction enzyme sites. The prefix sequence encodes EcoRI (E) and Xbal (X) sites, while the suffix sequence encodes SpeI (S) and PstI (P) sites. The prefix and the suffix are not considered part of the BioBrick part. To facilitate the assembly process, the BioBrick part itself must not contain any of these restriction sites. During the assembly of two different parts, one of the plasmids is digested with EcoRI and SpeI. The plasmid carrying the other BioBrick part is digested with EcoRI and Xbal. This leaves both plasmids with 4 base pair (bp) overhangs at the 5′ and 3′ ends. The EcoRI sites will ligate since they are complementary to each other. The Xbal and SpeI sites will also ligate as the digestion produces compatible ends. Now, both the DNA parts are in one plasmid. The ligation produces an 8 base pair "scar" site between the two BioBrick parts. Since the scar site is a hybrid of the Xbal and SpeI sites, it is not recognized by either restriction enzyme. The prefix and suffix sequences remain unchanged by this digestion and ligation process, which allows for subsequent assembly steps with more BioBrick parts.

This assembly is an idempotent process: multiple applications do not change the end product, and maintain the prefix and suffix. Although the BioBrick standard assembly allows for the formation of functional modules, there is a limitation to this standard 10 approach. The 8 bp scar site does not allow the creation of a fusion protein. The scar site causes a frame shift which prevents the continuous reading of codons, which is required for the formation of fusion protein.

Tom Knight later developed the BB-2 assembly standard in 2008 to address problems with joining the scars of protein domains and that the scars consist of eight bases, which will yield an altered reading frame when joining protein domains. The enzymes used for digestion of the initial parts are almost the same, but with modified prefixes and suffixes.

=== BglBricks assembly standard ===
The BglBrick assembly standard was proposed by J. Christopher Anderson, John E. Dueber, Mariana Leguia, Gabriel C. Wu, Jonathan C. Goler, Adam P. Arkin, and Jay D. Keasling in September 2009 as a standard very similar in concept to BioBrick, but enabling the generation of fusion proteins without altering the reading frame or introducing stop codons and while creating a relatively neutral amino acid linker scar (GlySer). A BglBrick part is as a DNA sequence flanked by 5′ EcoRI and BglII sites (GAATTCaaaAGATCT) and 3′ BamHI and XhoI sites (GGATCCaaaCTCGAG), and lacking in these same restriction sites internally. The upstream part in the pairwise assembly is purified from an EcoRI/BamHI digest, and the downstream part+vector is purified from an EcoRI/BglII digest. Ligation of these two fragments creates a composite part reforming the original flanking sites required in the part definition and leaving a GGATCT scar sequence at the junction of the parts, a scar that encodes the amino acids glycine and serine when fusing CDS parts together in-frame, convenient due to the GlySer dipeptide being a popular linker of protein domains.

=== Silver (Biofusion) standard ===
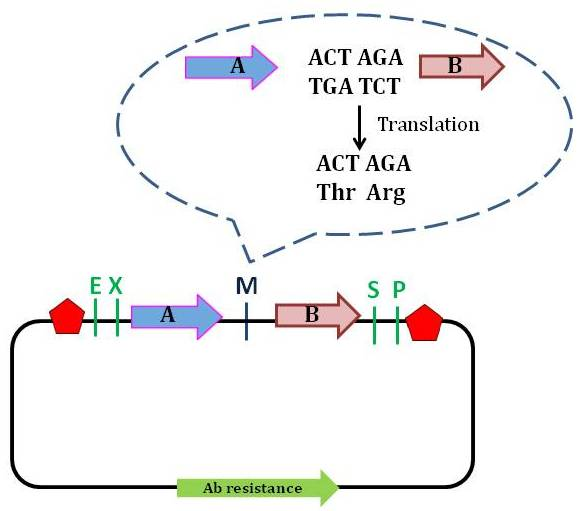
Biofusion assembly of two BioBrick parts.The schematic diagram shows the 6 base pair scar site made due to the deletion and insertion of nucleotide in the XbaI and SpeI sites.

Pam Silver's lab created the Silver assembly standard to overcome the issue surrounding the formation of fusion protein. This assembly standard is also known as Biofusion standard, and is an improvement of the BioBrick assembly standard 10. Silver's standard involves deletion of one nucleotide from the Xbal and SpeI site, which shortens the scar site by 2 nucleotides, which now forms a 6 bp scar sequence. The 6 bp sequence allows the reading frame to be maintained. The scar sequence codes for the amino acid threonine (ACT) and arginine (AGA). This minor improvement allows for the formation of in-frame fusion protein. However, arginine's being a large, charged amino acid is a disadvantage to the Biofusion assembly technique: these properties of arginine result in the destabilisation of the protein by the N-end rule.

=== Freiburg standard ===
The 2007 Freiburg iGEM team introduced a new assembly standard to overcome the disadvantages of the existing Biofusion standard technique. The Freiburg team created a new set of prefix and suffix sequences by introducing additional restriction enzyme sites, AgeI and NgoMIV to the existing prefix and suffix respectively. These newly introduced restriction enzyme sites are BioBrick standard compatible. The Freiburg standard still forms a 6 bp scar site, but the scar sequence (ACCGGC) now codes for threonine and glycine respectively. This scar sequence results in a much more stable protein as the glycine forms a stable N-terminal, unlike the arginine, which signals for N-terminal degradation. The assembly technique proposed by the Freiburg team diminishes the limitations of the Biofusion standard.

== Assembly method ==
Different methods are used when it comes to assembling BioBricks. This is because some standards require different materials and methods (use of different restriction enzymes), while others are due to preferences in protocol because some methods of assembly have higher efficiency and is user-friendly.

=== 3 Antibiotic (3A) Assembly ===
The 3A assembly method is the most commonly used, as its compatible with assembly Standard 10, Silver standard as well as the Freiburg standard. This assembly method involves two BioBrick parts and a destination plasmid. The destination plasmid contains a toxic (lethal) gene, to ease the selection of a correctly assembled plasmid. The destination plasmids also have different antibiotic resistance genes than the plasmids carrying the BioBrick parts. All three plasmids are digested with an appropriate restriction enzyme and then allowed to ligate. Only the correctly assembled part will produce a viable composite part contained in the destination plasmid. This allows a good selection as only the correctly assembled BioBrick parts survive.

=== Amplified Insert Assembly ===
The amplified insert assembly method does not depend on prefix and suffix sequences, allowing to be used in combination with a majority of assembly standards. It also has a higher transformation rate than 3A assembly, and it does not require the involved plasmids to have different antibiotic resistance genes. This method reduces noise from uncut plasmids by amplifying a desired insert using PCR prior to digestion and treating the mixture with the restriction enzyme DpnI, which digests methylated DNA like plasmids. Eliminating the template plasmids with DpnI leaves only the insert to be amplified by PCR. To decrease the possibility of creating plasmids with unwanted combinations of insert and backbone, the backbone can be treated with phosphatase to prevent its religation.

=== Gibson Scarless Assembly ===
The Gibson scarless assembly method allows the joining of multiple BioBricks simultaneously. This method requires the desired sequences to have an overlap of 20 to 150 bps. Because BioBricks do not have this overlap, this method requires PCR primers to create overhangs between adjacent BioBricks. T5 exonuclease attacks the 5′ ends of sequences, creating single-stranded DNA in the ends of all sequences where the different components are designed to anneal. DNA polymerase then adds DNA parts to gaps in the anneal components, and a Taq ligase can seal the final strands.

=== Methylase-assisted (4R/2M) Assembly ===
The 4R/2M assembly method was designed to combine parts (BioBrick Assembly Standard 10 or Silver Standard) within existing plasmids (i.e. without PCR or subcloning). The plasmids are reacted in vivo with sequence-specific DNA methyltransferases, so that each is modified and protected from one of two restriction endonucleases that are later used to linearize undesired circular ligation products.

== Parts Registry ==
The MIT group led by Tom Knight that developed BioBricks and International Genetically Engineered Machines (iGEM) competition are also the pioneers of The Registry of Standard Biological Parts (Registry). Registry being one of the foundations of synthetic biology, provides web-based information and data on over 20,000 BioBrick parts. The Registry contains:

- Information and characterisation data for all parts, device and system
- Includes a catalogue which describes the function, performance and design of each part

Every BioBrick part has its unique identification code which makes the search for the desired BioBrick part easier (for example, BBa_J23100, a constitutive promoter). The registry is open access, whereby anyone can submit a BioBrick part. Most of the BioBrick submission is from students participating in the annual iGEM competition hosted every summer. The Registry allows exchange of data and materials online which allows rapid re-use and modifications of parts by the participating community.

Professional parts registries have also been developed. Since most of the BioBrick parts are submitted by undergraduates as part of the iGEM competition, the parts may lack important characterisation data and metadata which would be essential when it comes to designing and modelling the functional components. One example of a professional parts registry is the USA-based publicly funded facility, The International Open Facility Advancing Biotechnology (BIOFAB), which contains detailed descriptions of each biological part. It is also an open-source registry, and is available commercially. BIOFAB aims to catalogue high-quality BioBrick parts to accommodate the needs of professional synthetic biology community.

The BioBrick Foundation (BBF) is a public-benefit organization established to promote the use of standardized BioBrick parts on a scale beyond the iGEM competition. The BBF is currently working on the derivation of standard framework to promote the production high quality BioBrick parts which would be freely available to everyone.

== See also ==
- Synthetic biology
- Wetware
- iGEM Competition
