= Hypothetical types of biochemistry =

Possible alternative biochemicals used by life forms

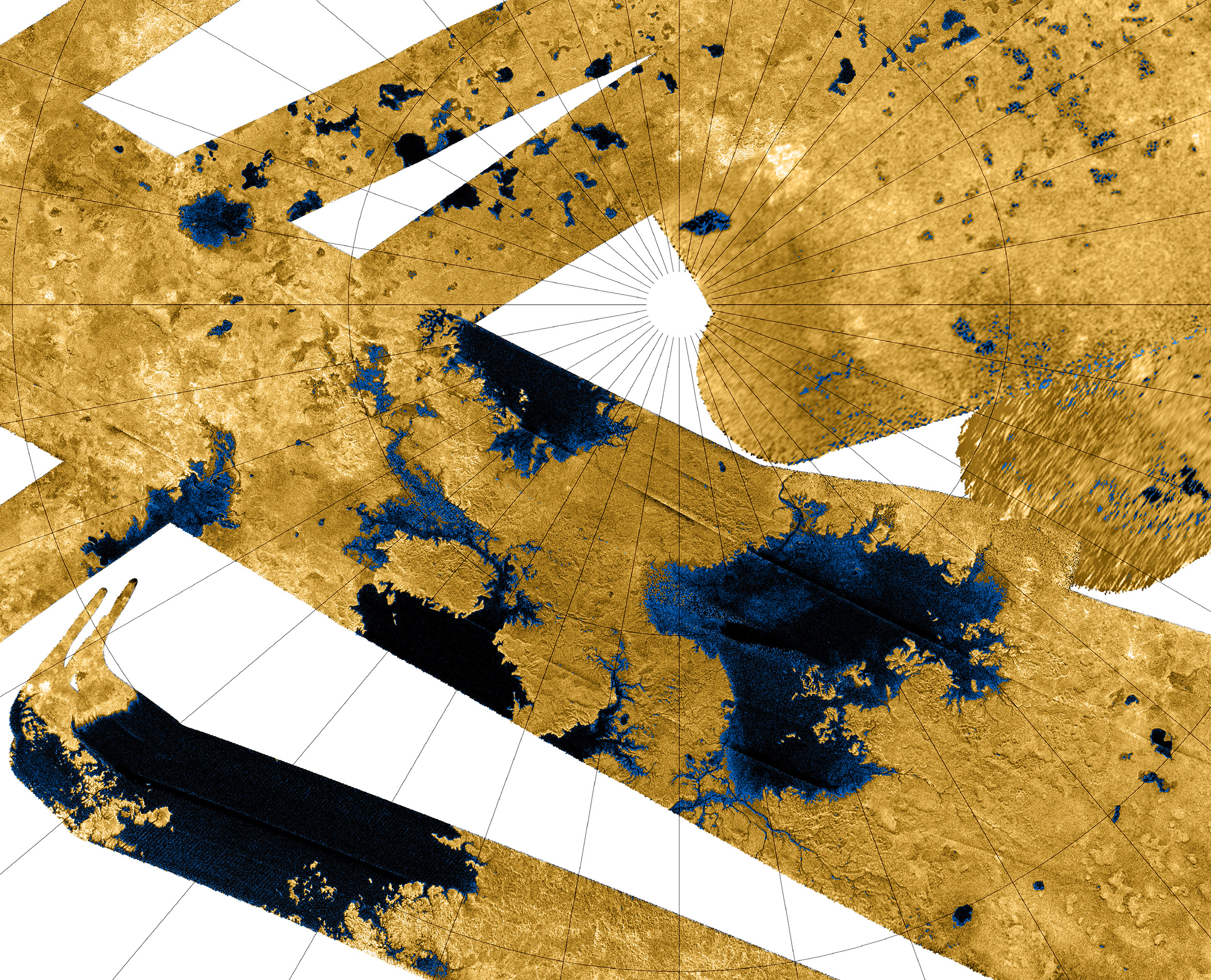
False-color Cassini radar mosaic of Titan's north polar region; the blue areas are lakes of liquid hydrocarbons. "The existence of lakes of liquid hydrocarbons on Titan opens up the possibility for solvents and energy sources that are alternatives to those in our biosphere and that might support novel life forms altogether different from those on Earth."—NASA Astrobiology Roadmap 2008

Several forms of biochemistry are agreed to be scientifically viable, but are not proven to exist at this time. The kinds of living organisms known on Earth, as of 2026, all use carbon compounds for basic structural and metabolic functions, water as a solvent, and deoxyribonucleic acid (DNA) or ribonucleic acid (RNA) to define and control their form. If life exists on other celestial bodies (planets, moons), it may be chemically similar, though it is also possible that there are organisms with quite different chemistries – for instance, involving other classes of carbon compounds, compounds of another element, and/or another solvent in place of water.

The possibility of life-forms being based on "alternative" biochemistries is the topic of an ongoing scientific discussion, informed by what is known about extraterrestrial environments and about the chemical behaviour of various elements and compounds. It is of interest in synthetic biology and is also a common subject in science fiction.

The element silicon has been much discussed as a hypothetical alternative to carbon. Silicon is in the same group as carbon on the periodic table and, like carbon, it is tetravalent. Hypothetical alternatives to water include ammonia, which, like water, is a polar molecule, and cosmically abundant; and non-polar hydrocarbon solvents such as methane and ethane, which are known to exist in liquid form on the surface of Titan.

== Overview of hypothetical types of biochemistry ==
Overview of hypothetical types of biochemistry
Type	Basis	Brief description	Details
Alternative-chirality biomolecules	Alternative biochemistry	Mirror image biochemistry	Alternative-chirality biomolecules refer to biomolecules with reflected chirality. In known Earth-based life, amino acids are almost universally of the L form and sugars are of the D form; however, the mirror-image forms could equally form the basis for alternative biochemistries. Synthetic biologists have proposed creating mirror-image versions of existing organisms, using entirely mirror-image biochemistry; these would behave identically to their template organisms except when interacting with existing biomolecules. Mirror-image microorganisms would be resistant to the immune systems of existing organisms. Scientists have stated concern over this risk and discouraged the creation of them.
Alternative nucleic acids	Alternative biochemistry	Different genetic storage	Xeno nucleic acids (XNA) may possibly be used in place of RNA or DNA. XNA is the general term for a nucleic acid with an altered sugar backbone. Examples of XNA are: TNA, which uses threose; HNA, which uses 1,5-anhydrohexitol; GNA, which uses glycol; CeNA, which uses cyclohexene; LNA, which utilizes a form of ribose that contains an extra linkage between its 4' carbon and 2' oxygen; FANA, which uses arabinose, but with a single fluorine atom attached to its 2' carbon; PNA, which uses, in place of sugar and phosphate, N-(2-aminoethyl)-glycine units connected by peptide bonds.; In comparison, hachimoji DNA changes the base pairs instead of the backbone. These new base pairs are P (2-aminoimidazo[1,2a][1,3,5]triazin-4(1H)-one), Z (6-amino-5-nitropyridin-2-one), B (isoguanine), and S (rS=isocytosine for RNA, dS=1-methylcytosine for DNA).
Ammonia biochemistry	Non-water solvents	Ammonia-based life	Ammonia is relatively abundant in the universe and has chemical similarities to water. The possible role of liquid ammonia as an alternative solvent for life is an idea dating back to 1954 at least, when J. B. S. Haldane raised the topic at a symposium about life's origin.
Arsenic biochemistry	Alternative biochemistry	Arsenic-based life	Arsenic, while poisonous for most life forms on Earth, might be an alternative chemically similar phosphorus.
Borane biochemistry (organoboron chemistry)	Alternative biochemistry	Borane-based life	Boranes are dangerously explosive in Earth's atmosphere but would be more stable in a reducing atmosphere (environment), one with no oxygen or other oxidizing gases, and which may contain actively reductant gases such as hydrogen, carbon monoxide, methane, and hydrogen sulfide. Molecular structures containing alternating boron and nitrogen atoms share some properties with hydrocarbons. However, boron is far rarer in the universe than its neighbours of carbon, nitrogen, and oxygen.
Cosmic necklace-based biology	Nonplanetary life	Non-chemical life	In 2020, Luis A. Anchordoqui and Eugene M. Chudnovsky hypothesized that life composed of magnetic semipoles connected by cosmic strings could evolve inside stars.
Dusty plasma-based biology	Nonplanetary life	Non-chemical life	In 2007, Vadim N. Tsytovich and colleagues proposed that lifelike behaviours could be exhibited by dust particles suspended in a plasma, under conditions that might exist in space.
Extremophiles	Alternative environment	Life in variable environments	It would be biochemically possible to sustain life in environments that are only periodically consistent with life as we know it, such as extremely high or low temperatures, pressures, or pH; or the presence of high levels of salt or nuclear radiation.
Heteropoly acid biochemistry	Alternative biochemistry	Heteropoly acid-based life	Various metals can form complex structures with oxygen, such as heteropoly acids.
Hydrogen fluoride biochemistry	Non-water solvents	Hydrogen fluoride-based life	Hydrogen fluoride has been considered as a possible solvent for life by scientists such as Peter Sneath.
Hydrogen sulfide biochemistry	Non-water solvents	Hydrogen sulfide-based life	Hydrogen sulfide is a chemical analog of water but is less polar and a weaker inorganic solvent.
Methane biochemistry (azotosome)	Non-water solvents	Methane-based life	Methane is relatively abundant in the Solar System and the Universe and is known to exist in liquid form on Titan, the largest moon of Saturn. Though highly unlikely, it is considered possible that Titan could harbor life. If so, it would most likely be methane-based life.
Non-green photosynthesizers	Other speculations	Alternate plant life	Physicists have noted that, although photosynthesis on Earth generally involves green plants, a variety of other-colored plants could also support photosynthesis, essential for most life on Earth, and that other colors might be preferred in places that receive a different mix of stellar radiation than Earth. In particular, retinal is capable of, and has been observed to, perform photosynthesis. Bacteria capable of photosynthesis are known as microbial rhodopsins. A plant or creature that uses retinal photosynthesis is always purple.
Shadow biosphere	Alternative environment	A hidden life biosphere on Earth	A shadow biosphere is a hypothetical microbial biosphere of Earth that uses radically different biochemical and molecular processes than currently known life. It could exist, for example, deep in the crust or sealed in ancient rocks.
Silicon biochemistry (organosilicon)	Alternative biochemistry	Silicon-based life	Like carbon, silicon can create molecules that are sufficiently large to carry biological information; however, the scope of possible silicon chemistry is far more limited than that of carbon.
Silicon dioxide biochemistry	Non-water solvents	Silicon dioxide-based life	Gerald Feinberg and Robert Shapiro have suggested that molten silicate rock could serve as a liquid medium for organisms with a chemistry based on silicon, oxygen, and other elements such as aluminium.
Sulfur biochemistry	Alternative biochemistry	Sulfur-based life	The biological use of sulfur as an alternative to carbon is purely hypothetical, especially because sulfur usually forms linear chains rather than branched ones.

== Shadow biosphere ==
The Arecibo message (1974) transmitted information into space about basic chemistry of Earth life.

A shadow biosphere is a hypothetical microbial biosphere of Earth that uses radically different biochemical and molecular processes than currently known life. Although life on Earth is relatively well-studied, the shadow biosphere may still remain unnoticed because the exploration of the microbial world targets primarily the biochemistry of the macro-organisms.

== Mirror life ==
In known Earth-based life, amino acids are almost universally of the L form and sugars are of the D form. Life using D amino acids or L sugars, called mirror life, may be possible; molecules of such a chirality, however, would be incompatible with organisms using the opposing chirality molecules. Amino acids which chirality is opposite to the norm are found on Earth, and these substances are generally thought to result from decay of organisms of normal chirality. However, physicist Paul Davies speculates that some of them might be products of "anti-chiral" life.

It is questionable, however, whether such a biochemistry would be truly alien. Although it would certainly be an alternative stereochemistry, molecules that are overwhelmingly found in one enantiomer throughout the vast majority of organisms can nonetheless often be found in another enantiomer in different (often basal) organisms such as in comparisons between members of Archaea and other domains, making it an open topic whether an alternative stereochemistry is truly novel.

== Non-carbon-based biochemistries ==
On Earth, all known living things have a carbon-based structure and system. Scientists have speculated about the advantages and disadvantages of using elements other than carbon to form the molecular structures necessary for life, but no one has proposed a theory employing such atoms to form all the necessary structures. However, as Carl Sagan argued, it is very difficult to be certain whether a statement that applies to all life on Earth will turn out to apply to all life throughout the universe. Sagan used the term "carbon chauvinism" for such an assumption. He regarded silicon and germanium as conceivable alternatives to carbon (other plausible elements include but are not limited to palladium and titanium); but, on the other hand, he noted that carbon does seem more chemically versatile and is more abundant in the cosmos. Norman Horowitz devised the experiments to determine whether life might exist on Mars that were carried out by the Viking Lander of 1976, the first U.S. mission to successfully land a probe on the surface of Mars. Horowitz argued that the great versatility of the carbon atom makes it the element most likely to provide solutions, even exotic solutions, to the problems of survival on other planets. He considered that there was only a remote possibility that non-carbon life forms could exist with genetic information systems capable of self-replication and the ability to evolve and adapt.

=== Silicon biochemistry ===
Structure of silane, analogue of methane

Structure of the silicone polydimethylsiloxane (PDMS)

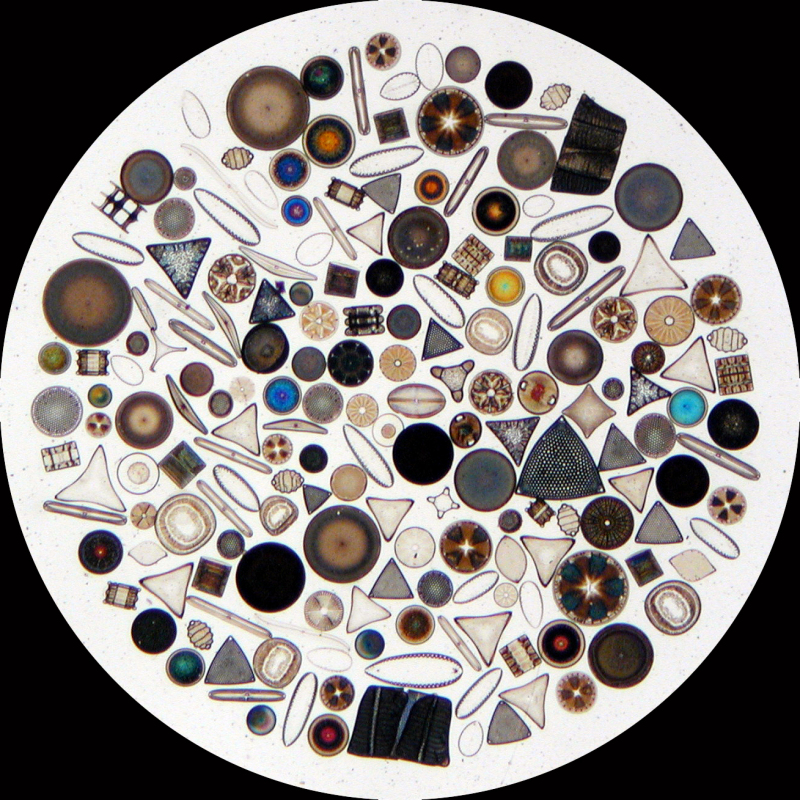
Marine diatoms – carbon-based organisms that extract silicon from sea water, in the form of its oxide (silica) and incorporate it into their cell walls

The silicon atom has been much discussed as the basis for an alternative biochemical system, because silicon has many chemical similarities to carbon and is in the same group of the periodic table. Like carbon, silicon can create molecules that are sufficiently large to carry biological information.

However, silicon has several drawbacks as a carbon alternative. Carbon is ten times more cosmically abundant than silicon, and its chemistry appears naturally more complex. By 1998, astronomers had identified 84 carbon-containing molecules in the interstellar medium, but only 8 containing silicon, of which half also include carbon. Even though Earth and other terrestrial planets are exceptionally silicon-rich and carbon-poor (silicon is roughly 925 times more abundant in Earth's crust than carbon), terrestrial life bases itself on carbon. This might be due to the comparatively lower diversity of functional groups observed in naturally-occurring silicon-based polymers.

Relative to carbon, silicon has a much larger atomic radius, and forms much weaker covalent bonds to atoms — except oxygen and fluorine, with which it forms very strong bonds. Almost no multiple bonds to silicon are stable, although silicon does exhibit varied coordination number. Silanes, silicon analogues to the alkanes, react rapidly with water, and long-chain silanes spontaneously decompose. Consequently, most terrestrial silicon is "locked up" in silica, and not a wide variety of biogenic precursors.

Silicones, which alternate between silicon and oxygen atoms, are much more stable than silanes, and may even be more stable than the equivalent hydrocarbons in sulfuric acid-rich extraterrestrial environments. Alternatively, the weak bonds in silicon compounds may help maintain a rapid pace of life at cryogenic temperatures. Polysilanols, the silicon homologues to sugars, are among the few compounds soluble in liquid nitrogen.

All known silicon macromolecules are artificial polymers, and so "monotonous compared with the combinatorial universe of organic macromolecules." Even so, some Earth life uses biogenic silica, for instance diatoms' silicate skeletons. A. G. Cairns-Smith hypothesized that silicate minerals in water played a crucial role in abiogenesis, in that biogenic carbon compounds formed around their crystal structures. Although not observed in nature, carbon–silicon bonds have been added to biochemistry under directed evolution (artificial selection): a cytochrome c protein from Rhodothermus marinus has been engineered to catalyse new carbon–silicon bonds between hydrosilanes and diazo compounds.

=== Other exotic element-based biochemistries ===
- Boranes are dangerously explosive in Earth's atmosphere, but would be more stable in a reducing atmosphere. However, boron's low cosmic abundance makes it less likely as a base for life than carbon.
- Various metals, together with oxygen, can form very complex and thermally stable structures rivalling those of organic compounds; the heteropoly acids are one such family. Some metal oxides are also similar to carbon in their ability to form both nanotube structures and diamond-like crystals (such as cubic zirconia). Titanium, aluminium, magnesium, and iron are all more abundant in Earth's crust than carbon. Metal-oxide-based life could therefore be a possibility under certain conditions, including those (such as high temperatures) at which carbon-based life would be unlikely. The Cronin group at Glasgow University reported self-assembly of tungsten polyoxometalates into cell-like spheres. By modifying their metal oxide content, the spheres can acquire holes that act as porous membrane, selectively allowing chemicals in and out of the sphere according to size.
- Sulfur is also able to form long-chain molecules, but suffers from the same high-reactivity problems as phosphorus and silanes. The biological use of sulfur as an alternative to carbon is purely hypothetical, especially because sulfur usually forms only linear chains rather than branched ones. The biological use of sulfur as an electron acceptor is widespread and can be traced back 3.5 billion years on Earth, thus predating the use of molecular oxygen. Sulfur-reducing bacteria can utilize elemental sulfur instead of oxygen, reducing sulfur to hydrogen sulfide.

== Arsenic as an alternative to phosphorus ==
While arsenic, which is chemically similar to phosphorus, is poisonous for most life forms on Earth, it is incorporated into the biochemistry of some organisms. Some marine algae incorporate arsenic into complex organic molecules such as arsenosugars and arsenobetaines. Fungi and bacteria can produce volatile methylated arsenic compounds. Arsenate reduction and arsenite oxidation have been observed in microbes (Chrysiogenes arsenatis). Additionally, some prokaryotes can use arsenate as a terminal electron acceptor during anaerobic growth and some can utilize arsenite as an electron donor to generate energy.

It has been speculated that the earliest life forms on Earth may have used arsenic biochemistry in place of phosphorus in the structure of their DNA. A common objection to this scenario is that arsenate esters are so much less stable to hydrolysis than corresponding phosphate esters that arsenic is poorly suited for this function.

The authors of a 2010 geomicrobiology study, supported in part by NASA, have postulated that a bacterium named GFAJ-1, collected in the sediments of Mono Lake in eastern California, can employ such 'arsenic DNA' when cultured without phosphorus. They proposed that the bacterium may employ high levels of poly-β-hydroxybutyrate or other means to reduce the effective concentration of water and stabilize its arsenate esters. This claim was heavily criticized almost immediately after publication for the perceived lack of appropriate controls. Other authors were unable to reproduce their results and showed that the study had issues with phosphate contamination, suggesting that the low amounts present could sustain extremophile lifeforms. The 2010 paper was retracted in 2025.

== Non-water solvents ==
In addition to carbon compounds, all currently known terrestrial life also requires water as a solvent. This has led to discussions about whether water is the only liquid capable of filling that role. The idea that an extraterrestrial life-form might be based on a solvent other than water has been taken seriously in recent scientific literature by the biochemist Steven Benner, and by the astrobiological committee chaired by John A. Baross. Solvents discussed by the Baross committee include ammonia, sulfuric acid, formamide, hydrocarbons, and (at temperatures much lower than Earth's) liquid nitrogen, or hydrogen in the form of a supercritical fluid.

Water as a solvent limits the forms biochemistry can take. For example, Steven Benner, proposes the polyelectrolyte theory of the gene that claims that for a genetic biopolymer such as DNA to function in water, it requires repeated ionic charges. If water is not required for life, these limits on genetic biopolymers are removed.

Carl Sagan once described himself as both a carbon chauvinist and a water chauvinist; however, on another occasion he said that he was a carbon chauvinist but "not that much of a water chauvinist". He speculated on hydrocarbons, hydrofluoric acid, and ammonia as possible alternatives to water.

Some of the properties of water that are important for life processes include:

- A complexity which leads to a large number of permutations of possible reaction paths including acid–base chemistry, H^{+} cations, OH^{−} anions, hydrogen bonding, van der Waals bonding, dipole–dipole and other polar interactions, aqueous solvent cages, and hydrolysis. This complexity offers a large number of pathways for evolution to produce life, many other solvents have dramatically fewer possible reactions, which severely limits evolution.
- Thermodynamic stability: the free energy of formation of liquid water is low enough (−237.24 kJ/mol) that water undergoes few reactions. Other solvents are highly reactive, particularly with oxygen.
- Water does not combust in oxygen because it is already the combustion product of hydrogen with oxygen. Most alternative solvents are not stable in an oxygen-rich atmosphere, so it is highly unlikely that those liquids could support aerobic life.
- A large temperature range over which it is liquid.
- High solubility of oxygen and carbon dioxide at room temperature supporting the evolution of aerobic aquatic plant and animal life.
- A high heat capacity (leading to higher environmental temperature stability).
- Water is a room-temperature liquid leading to a large population of quantum transition states required to overcome reaction barriers. Cryogenic liquids (such as liquid methane) have exponentially lower transition state populations which are needed for life based on chemical reactions. This leads to chemical reaction rates which may be so slow as to preclude the development of any life based on chemical reactions.
- Spectroscopic transparency allowing solar radiation to penetrate several meters into the liquid (or solid), greatly aiding the evolution of aquatic life.
- A large heat of vaporization leading to stable lakes and oceans.
- The ability to dissolve a wide variety of compounds.
- The solid (ice) has lower density than the liquid, so ice floats on the liquid. This is why bodies of water freeze over but do not freeze solid (from the bottom up). If ice were denser than liquid water (as is true for nearly all other compounds), then large bodies of liquid would slowly freeze solid, which would not be conducive to the formation of life.

Water as a compound is cosmically abundant, although much of it is in the form of vapor or ice. Subsurface liquid water is considered likely or possible on several of the outer moons: Enceladus and Europa (where geysers have been observed), Titan, and Ganymede. Earth and Titan are the only worlds currently known to have stable bodies of liquid on their surfaces.

Not all properties of water are necessarily advantageous for life, however. For instance, water ice has a high albedo, meaning that it reflects a significant quantity of light and heat from the Sun. During ice ages, as reflective ice builds up over the surface of the water, the effects of global cooling are increased.

There are some properties that make certain compounds and elements much more favourable than others as solvents in a successful biosphere. The solvent must be able to exist in liquid equilibrium over a range of temperatures the planetary object would normally encounter. Because boiling points vary with the pressure, the question tends not to be does the prospective solvent remain liquid, but at what pressure. For example, hydrogen cyanide has a narrow liquid-phase temperature range at 1 atmosphere, but in an atmosphere with the pressure of Venus, with 91 standard atmospheres (92 bar) of pressure, it can exist in liquid form over a wide temperature range.

=== Ammonia ===
The ammonia molecule (NH_{3}), like the water molecule, is abundant in the universe, being a compound of hydrogen (the simplest and most common element) with another very common element, nitrogen. The possible role of liquid ammonia as an alternative solvent for life is an idea dating back to 1954 at least, when J. B. S. Haldane raised the topic at a symposium about life's origin.

Many chemical reactions can occur in an ammonia solution, and liquid ammonia has chemical similarities with water. Ammonia dissolves most organic molecules at least as well as water does, and many elemental metals. Haldane indicated that various common water-related organic compounds have ammonia-related analogues; for instance, the ammonia-related amine group (−NH_{2}) is analogous to the water-related hydroxyl group (−OH).

Ammonia, like water, can either accept or donate an H^{+} ion. When ammonia accepts an H^{+}, it forms the ammonium cation (NH_{4}^{+}), analogous to hydronium (H_{3}O^{+}). When it donates an H^{+} ion, it forms the amide anion (NH_{2}^{−}), analogous to the hydroxide anion (OH^{−}). Compared to water, however, ammonia is more inclined to accept an H^{+} ion, and less inclined to donate one; it is a stronger nucleophile. Ammonia added to water functions as an Arrhenius base: it increases the concentration of the anion hydroxide. Conversely, using a solvent system definition of acidity and basicity, water added to liquid ammonia functions as an acid, because it increases the concentration of the cation ammonium. The carbonyl group (C=O), which is much used in terrestrial biochemistry, would not be stable in ammonia solution, but the analogous imine group (C=NH) could be used instead.

However, ammonia has some problems as a basis for life. The hydrogen bonds between ammonia molecules are weaker than those in water, causing ammonia's heat of vaporization to be half that of water, its surface tension to be a third, and reducing its ability to concentrate non-polar molecules through a hydrophobic effect. Gerald Feinberg and Robert Shapiro have questioned whether ammonia could hold prebiotic molecules together well enough to allow the emergence of a self-reproducing system. Ammonia is also flammable in oxygen and could not exist sustainably in an environment suitable for aerobic metabolism.

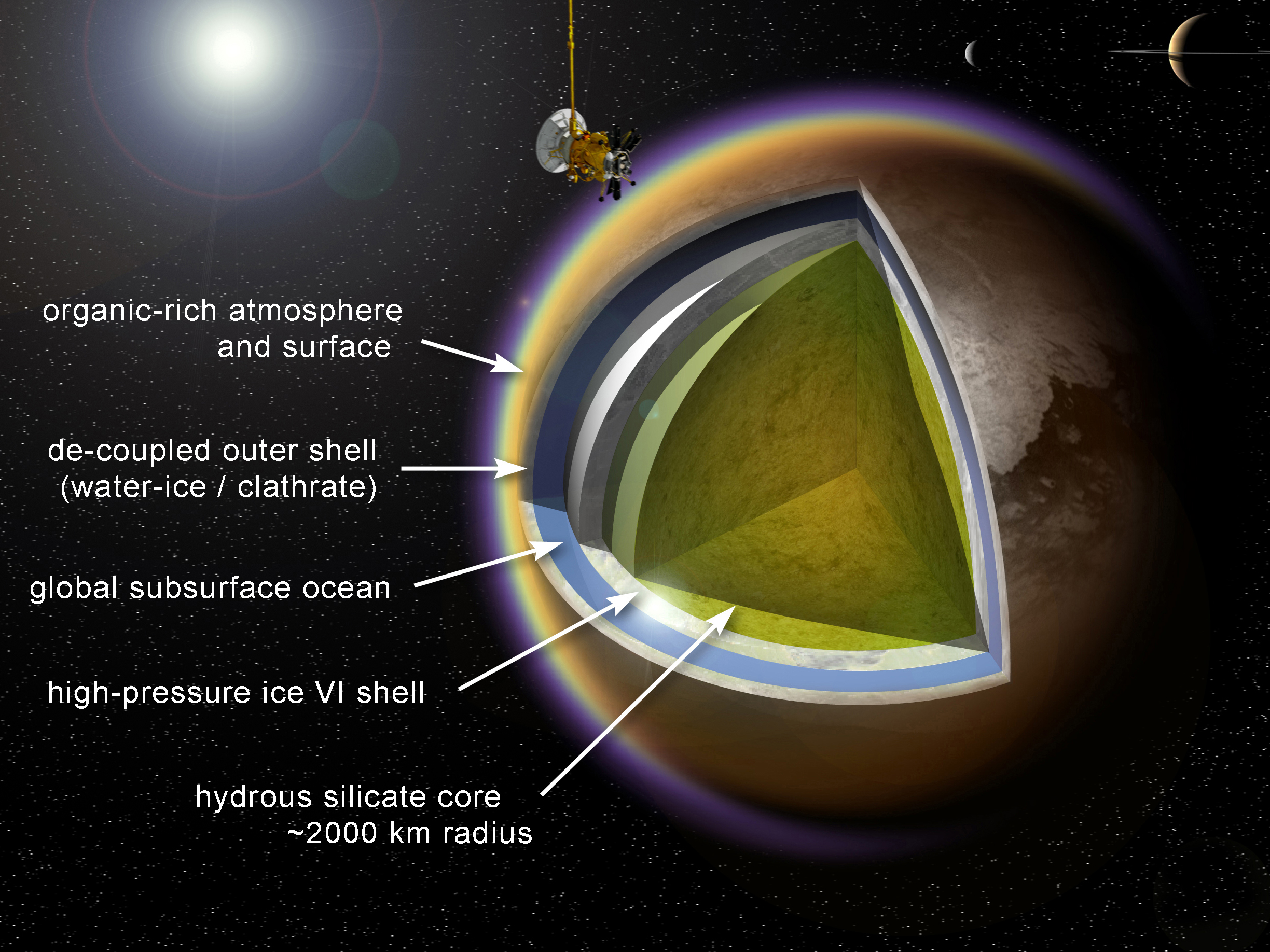
Titan's theorized internal structure, subsurface ocean shown in blue

A biosphere based on ammonia would likely exist at temperatures or air pressures that are extremely unusual in relation to life on Earth. Life on Earth usually exists between the melting point and boiling point of water, at a pressure designated as normal pressure, between 0 and 100 °C (273 and 373 K). When also held to normal pressure, ammonia's melting and boiling points are −78 °C (195 K) and −33 °C (240 K) respectively. Because chemical reactions generally proceed more slowly at lower temperatures, ammonia-based life existing in this set of conditions might metabolize more slowly and evolve more slowly than life on Earth. On the other hand, lower temperatures could also enable living systems to use chemical species that would be too unstable at Earth temperatures to be useful.

A set of conditions where ammonia is liquid at Earth-like temperatures would involve it being at a much higher pressure. For example, at 60 atm ammonia melts at −77 °C (196 K) and boils at 98 °C (371 K).

Ammonia and ammonia–water mixtures remain liquid at temperatures far below the freezing point of pure water, so such biochemistries might be well suited to planets and moons orbiting outside the water-based habitability zone. Such conditions could exist, for example, under the surface of Saturn's largest moon Titan.

=== Methane and other hydrocarbons ===
Methane (CH_{4}) is a simple hydrocarbon: that is, a compound of two of the most common elements in the cosmos: hydrogen and carbon. It has a cosmic abundance comparable with ammonia. Hydrocarbons could act as a solvent over a wide range of temperatures but would lack polarity. Isaac Asimov, the biochemist and science fiction writer, suggested in 1981 that poly-lipids could form a substitute for proteins in a non-polar solvent such as methane. Lakes composed of a mixture of hydrocarbons, including methane and ethane, have been detected on the surface of Titan by the Cassini spacecraft.

There is debate about the effectiveness of methane and other hydrocarbons as a solvent for life compared to water or ammonia. Water is a stronger solvent than the hydrocarbons, enabling easier transport of substances in a cell. However, water is also more chemically reactive and can break down large organic molecules through hydrolysis. A life-form in which solvent was a hydrocarbon would not face the threat of its biomolecules being destroyed in this way. Also, the water molecule's tendency to form strong hydrogen bonds can interfere with internal hydrogen bonding in complex organic molecules. Life with a hydrocarbon solvent could make more use of hydrogen bonds within its biomolecules. Moreover, the strength of hydrogen bonds within biomolecules would be appropriate to a low-temperature biochemistry.

Astrobiologist Chris McKay has argued, on thermodynamic grounds, that if life does exist on Titan's surface, using hydrocarbons as a solvent, it is likely also to use the more complex hydrocarbons as an energy source by reacting them with hydrogen, reducing ethane and acetylene to methane. Possible evidence for this form of life on Titan was identified in 2010 by Darrell Strobel of Johns Hopkins University; a greater abundance of molecular hydrogen in the upper atmospheric layers of Titan compared to the lower layers, arguing for a downward diffusion at a rate of roughly 10^{25} molecules per second and disappearance of hydrogen near Titan's surface. As Strobel noted, his findings were in line with the effects Chris McKay had predicted if methanogenic life-forms were present. The same year, another study showed low levels of acetylene on Titan's surface, which were interpreted by Chris McKay as consistent with the hypothesis of organisms reducing acetylene to methane. While restating the biological hypothesis, McKay cautioned that other explanations for the hydrogen and acetylene findings are to be considered more likely: the possibilities of yet unidentified physical or chemical processes (e.g. a non-living surface catalyst enabling acetylene to react with hydrogen), or flaws in the current models of material flow. He noted that even a non-biological catalyst effective at 95 K would in itself be a startling discovery.

==== Azotosome ====
A hypothetical cell membrane termed an azotosome, able to function in liquid methane in Titan conditions was computer-modelled in an article published in February 2015. Composed of acrylonitrile, a small molecule containing carbon, hydrogen, and nitrogen, it is predicted to have stability and flexibility in liquid methane comparable to that of a phospholipid bilayer (the type of cell membrane possessed by all life on Earth) in liquid water. An analysis of data obtained using the Atacama Large Millimeter / submillimeter Array (ALMA), completed in 2017, confirmed substantial amounts of acrylonitrile in Titan's atmosphere. Later studies questioned whether acrylonitrile would be able to self-assemble into azotosomes. However, in 2025 a new mechanism was proposed by scientists Christian Mayer and Conor Nixon to overcome the previous barriers to self-assembly of azotosomes in liquid methane, based on 'splashing' of a methane lake surface film by a hydrocarbon raindrop.

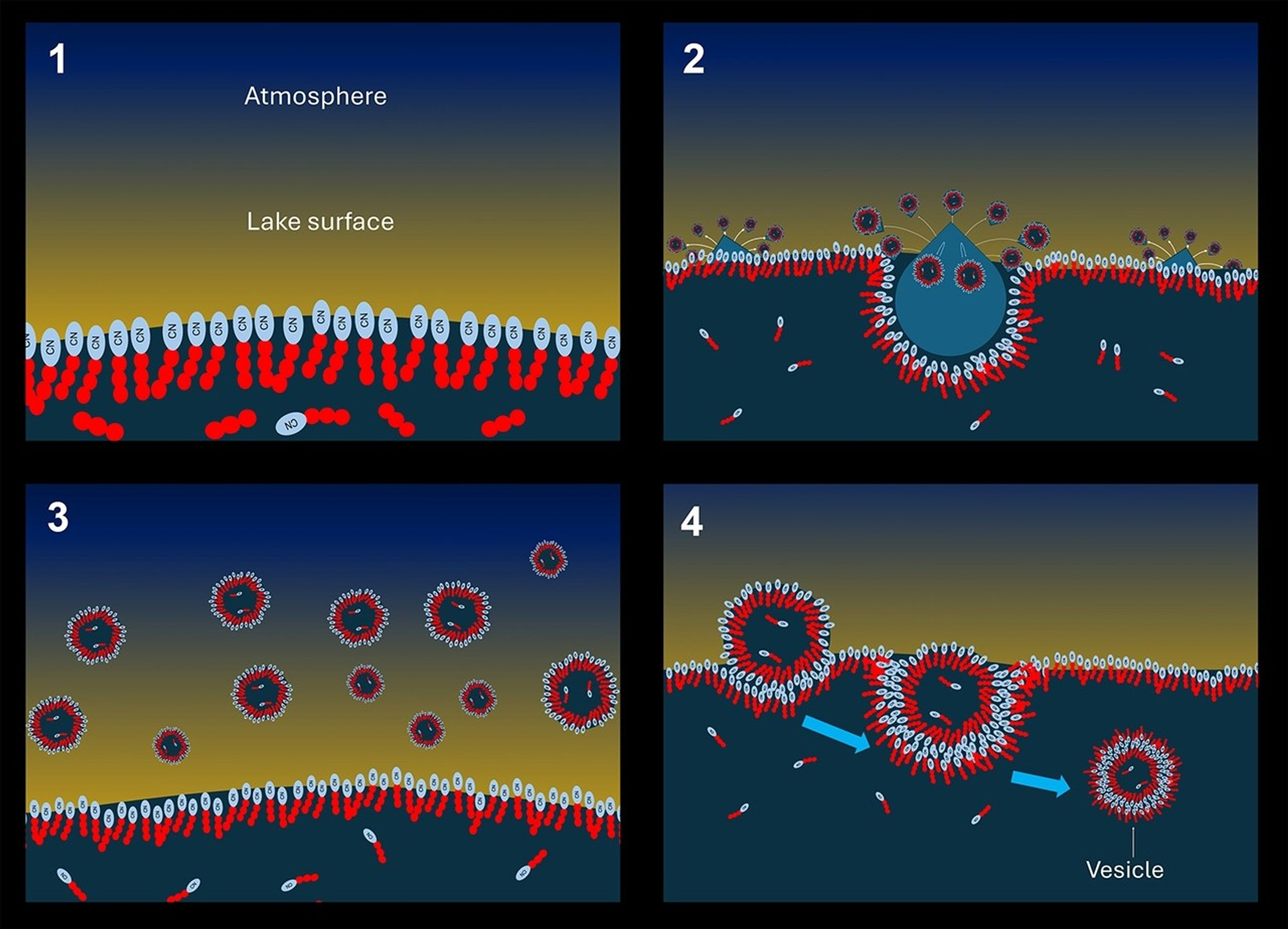
An artist's concept of the proposed mechanism for vesicle formation on Titan

=== Hydrogen fluoride ===
Hydrogen fluoride (HF), like water, is a polar molecule, and due to its polarity it can dissolve many ionic compounds. At atmospheric pressure, its melting point is 189.15 K (−84.00 °C), and its boiling point is 292.69 K (19.54 °C); the difference between the two is a little more than 100 K. HF also makes hydrogen bonds with its neighbour molecules, as do water and ammonia. It has been considered as a possible solvent for life by scientists such as Peter Sneath and Carl Sagan.

HF is dangerous to the systems of molecules that Earth-life is made of, but certain other organic compounds, such as paraffin waxes, are stable with it. Like water and ammonia, liquid hydrogen fluoride supports an acid–base chemistry. Using a solvent system definition of acidity and basicity, nitric acid functions as a base when it is added to liquid HF.

However, hydrogen fluoride is cosmically rare, unlike water, ammonia, and methane.

=== Hydrogen sulfide ===
Hydrogen sulfide is the closest chemical analog to water, but is less polar and is a weaker inorganic solvent. Hydrogen sulfide is quite plentiful on Jupiter's moon Io and may be in liquid form a short distance below the surface; astrobiologist Dirk Schulze-Makuch has suggested it as a possible solvent for life there. On a planet with hydrogen sulfide oceans, the source of the hydrogen sulfide could come from volcanoes, in which case it could be mixed in with a bit of hydrogen fluoride, which could help dissolve minerals. Hydrogen sulfide life might use a mixture of carbon monoxide and carbon dioxide as their carbon source. They might produce and live on sulfur monoxide, which is analogous to oxygen (O_{2}). Hydrogen sulfide, like hydrogen cyanide and ammonia, suffers from the small temperature range where it is liquid, though that, like that of hydrogen cyanide and ammonia, increases with increasing pressure.

=== Silicon dioxide and silicates ===
Silicon dioxide, also known as silica and quartz, is very abundant in the universe and has a large temperature range where it is liquid. However, its melting point is 1,600 to 1,725 °C (2,912 to 3,137 °F), so it would be impossible to make organic compounds in that temperature, because all of them would decompose. Silicates are similar to silicon dioxide and some have lower melting points than silica. Feinberg and Shapiro have suggested that molten silicate rock could serve as a liquid medium for organisms with a chemistry based on silicon, oxygen, and other elements such as aluminium.

=== Other solvents or cosolvents ===
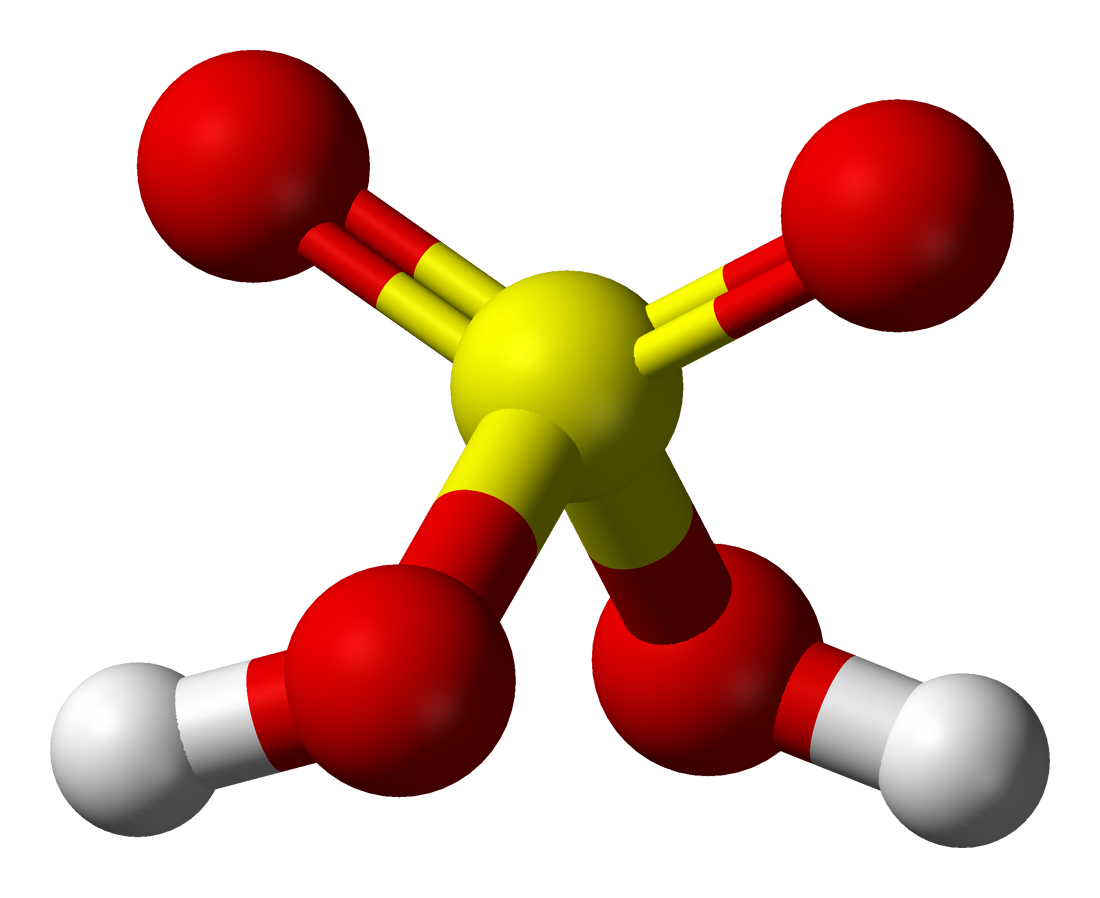
Sulfuric acid (H_{2}SO_{4})

Other solvents sometimes proposed:

- Supercritical fluids: supercritical carbon dioxide and supercritical hydrogen.
- Simple hydrogen compounds: hydrogen chloride.
- More complex compounds: sulfuric acid, formamide, methanol.
- Very-low-temperature fluids: liquid nitrogen and hydrogen.
- High-temperature liquids: sodium chloride.

Sulfuric acid in liquid form is strongly polar. It remains liquid at higher temperatures than water, its liquid range being 10 °C to 337 °C at a pressure of 1 atm, although above 300 °C it slowly decomposes. Sulfuric acid is known to be abundant in the clouds of Venus, in the form of aerosol droplets. In a biochemistry that used sulfuric acid as a solvent, the alkene group (C=C), with two carbon atoms joined by a double bond, could function analogously to the carbonyl group (C=O) in water-based biochemistry.

A proposal has been made that life on Mars may exist and be using a mixture of water and hydrogen peroxide as its solvent. A 61.2% (by mass) mix of water and hydrogen peroxide has a freezing point of −56.5 °C and tends to super-cool rather than crystallize. It is also hygroscopic, an advantage in a water-scarce environment.

Supercritical carbon dioxide has been proposed as a candidate for alternative biochemistry due to its ability to selectively dissolve organic compounds and assist the functioning of enzymes and because "super-Earth"- or "super-Venus"-type planets with dense high-pressure atmospheres may be common.

== Other speculations ==
=== Non-green photosynthesizers ===
Physicists have noted that, although photosynthesis on Earth generally involves green plants, a variety of other-colored plants could also support photosynthesis, essential for most life on Earth, and that other colors might be preferred in places that receive a different mix of stellar radiation than Earth. These studies indicate that blue plants would be unlikely; however yellow or red plants may be relatively common.

Some microorganisms use retinal instead of chlorophyll to convert light into metabolic energy. Because retinal absorbs mostly green light and transmits purple light, this gave rise to the Purple Earth hypothesis.

=== Variable environments ===
Many Earth plants and animals undergo major biochemical changes during their life cycles as a response to changing environmental conditions, for example, by having a spore or hibernation state that can be sustained for years or even millennia between more active life stages. Thus, it would be biochemically possible to sustain life in environments that are only periodically consistent with life as we know it.

For example, frogs in cold climates can survive for extended periods of time with most of their body water in a frozen state, whereas desert frogs in Australia can become inactive and dehydrate in dry periods, losing up to 75% of their fluids, yet return to life by rapidly rehydrating in wet periods. Either type of frog would appear biochemically inactive (i.e. not living) during dormant periods to anyone lacking a sensitive means of detecting low levels of metabolism.

=== Alanine world and hypothetical alternatives ===
Early stage of the genetic code (GC-Code) with "alanine world" and its possible alternatives

The genetic code may have evolved during the transition from the RNA world to a protein world. The alanine world hypothesis postulates that the evolution of the genetic code (the so-called GC phase) started with only four basic amino acids: alanine, glycine, proline and ornithine (now arginine). The evolution of the genetic code ended with 20 proteinogenic amino acids. From a chemical point of view, most of them are Alanine-derivatives particularly suitable for the construction of α-helices and β-sheets – basic secondary structural elements of modern proteins. Direct evidence of this is an experimental procedure in molecular biology known as alanine scanning.

A hypothetical proline world would create a possible alternative life with the genetic code based on the proline chemical scaffold as the protein backbone. Similarly, a glycine world and ornithine world are also conceivable, but nature has chosen none of them. Evolution of life with Proline, Glycine, or Ornithine as the basic structure for protein-like polymers (foldamers) would lead to parallel biological worlds. They would have morphologically radically different body plans and genetics from the living organisms of the known biosphere.

== Nonplanetary life ==
=== Dusty plasma-based ===
In 2007, Vadim N. Tsytovich and colleagues proposed that lifelike behaviors could be exhibited by dust particles suspended in a plasma, under conditions that might exist in space. Computer models showed that, when the dust became charged, the particles could self-organize into microscopic helical structures, and the authors offer "a rough sketch of a possible model of...helical grain structure reproduction".

=== Cosmic necklace-based ===
In 2020, Luis A. Anchordoqui and Eugene M. Chudnovsky of the City University of New York hypothesized that cosmic necklace-based life composed of magnetic monopoles connected by cosmic strings could evolve inside stars. This would be achieved by a stretching of cosmic strings due to the star's intense gravity, thus allowing it to take on more complex forms and potentially form structures similar to the RNA and DNA structures found within carbon-based life. As such, it is theoretically possible that such beings could eventually become intelligent and construct a civilization using the power generated by the star's nuclear fusion. Because such use would use up part of the star's energy output, the luminosity would also fall. For this reason, it is thought that such life might exist inside stars observed to be cooling faster or dimmer than current cosmological models predict.

=== Life on a neutron star ===
Frank Drake suggested in 1973 that intelligent life could inhabit neutron stars. Physical models in 1973 implied that Drake's creatures would be microscopic.

== Scientists who have published on this topic ==
Scientists who have considered possible alternatives to carbon-water biochemistry include:

- J. B. S. Haldane (1892–1964), a geneticist noted for his work on abiogenesis.
- V. Axel Firsoff (1910–1981), British astronomer. cited in Ammonia-based Life.
- Isaac Asimov (1920–1992), biochemist and science fiction writer.
- Fred Hoyle (1915–2001), astronomer, science fiction writer, panspermia proponent.
- Norman Horowitz (1915–2005), Caltech geneticist who devised the first experiments done to detect life on Mars.
- George C. Pimentel (1922–1989), American chemist, University of California, Berkeley.
- Peter Sneath (1923–2011), microbiologist, author of the book Planets and Life.
- Gerald Feinberg (1933–1992), physicist and Robert Shapiro (1935–2011), chemist, co-authors of the book Life Beyond Earth.
- Carl Sagan (1934–1996), astronomer, science popularizer, and SETI proponent.
- Jonathan Lunine (born 1959), American planetary scientist and physicist.
- Robert Freitas (born 1952), specialist in nanotechnology and nanomedicine. This work is acknowledged the partial basis of the article Ammonia-based Life.
- John Baross (born 1940), oceanographer and astrobiologist, who chaired a committee of scientists under the United States National Research Council that published a report on life's limiting conditions in 2007.

== See also ==
- Abiogenesis
- Astrobiology
- Carbon chauvinism
- Carbon-based life
- Chemical evolution
- Earliest known life forms
- Extraterrestrial life
- Hachimoji DNA
- Iron–sulfur world hypothesis
- Life origination beyond planets
- Mirror life
- Nexus for Exoplanet System Science
- Non-cellular life
- Non-proteinogenic amino acids
- Nucleic acid analogues
- Planetary habitability
- Shadow biosphere
- List of unsolved problems in biology
