= C5H7N3O =

C_{5}H_{7}N_{3}O may refer to:

- Methylcytosine
  - 5-Methylcytosine
  - 1-Methylcytosine, a nucleic acid in Hachimoji DNA
  - N(4)-Methylcytosine
  - 6-Methylcytosine
- Methylisocytosine
  - 1-Methylisocytosine
  - 3-Methylisocytosine
  - 4-Methylisocytosine
  - 5-Methylisocytosine
  - 6-Methylisocytosine (mecytosine)

== See also ==
- Cytosine
- Isocytosine
- Nucleic acid analogue
