= C5H5N5O =

The molecular formula C_{5}H_{5}N_{5}O (molar mass: 151.13 g/mol, exact mass: 151.0494 u) may refer to:

- 5-Aza-7-deazaguanine
- Guanine
- Isoguanine, or 2-hydroxyadenine
