= 5-Aza-7-deazapurine =

Names
- Preferred IUPAC name Imidazo[1,2-a][1,3,5]triazine
- Other names 5-Aza-7-deazapurine

Identifiers
CAS Number	274-96-4
3D model (JSmol)	Interactive image
ChemSpider	14350821
PubChem CID	19734140
CompTox Dashboard (EPA)	DTXSID501336481
- InChI: InChI=1S/C5H4N4/c1-2-9-4-6-3-8-5(9)7-1/h1-4H Key: OXISDMSERFAPRY-UHFFFAOYSA-N; InChI=1S/C5H4N4/c1-2-9-4-6-3-8-5(9)7-1/h1-4H Key: OXISDMSERFAPRY-UHFFFAOYSA-N
- SMILES: C1=CN2C=NC=NC2=N1

Properties
Chemical formula	C_{5}H_{4}N_{4}
Molar mass	120.115 g·mol^{−1}
- Except where otherwise noted, data are given for materials in their standard state (at 25 °C [77 °F], 100 kPa). Infobox references

5-Aza-7-deazapurine or imidazo[1,2-a][1,3,5]triazine is a heterocyclic aromatic organic compound that consists of a s-triazine ring fused to an imidazole ring. It is an isostere and isomer of purine. However, in 5-aza-7-deazapurine, N-9 of five-membered ring does not bond with hydrogen. So 5-aza-7-deazapurine derivatives must have an exocyclic substituent with a double bond to bind a sugar residue. 5-Aza-7-deazapurine nucleosides may have an oxo, thioxo, or a imine group.

Notable derivatives of this molecule include 5-aza-7-deazaguanine, which is a nucleobase of hachimoji DNA.

== See also ==
- Base analog
- Indolizine
- Purine analogue
