= 2,6-Diaminopurine =

Names
- Preferred IUPAC name 7H-Purine-2,6-diamine
- Other names 2-aminoadenine; 2,6-DAP

Identifiers
CAS Number	1904-98-9
3D model (JSmol)	Interactive image
ChEMBL	ChEMBL388596 =
ChemSpider	28738
ECHA InfoCard	100.016.006
PubChem CID	30976
UNII	49P95BAU4Z
CompTox Dashboard (EPA)	DTXSID0062052
- InChI: InChI=1S/C5H6N6/c6-3-2-4(9-1-8-2)11-5(7)10-3/h1H,(H5,6,7,8,9,10,11) = Key: MSSXOMSJDRHRMC-UHFFFAOYSA-N =; InChI=1S/C5H6N6/c6-3-2-4(9-1-8-2)11-5(7)10-3/h1H,(H5,6,7,8,9,10,11)
- SMILES: Nc1nc(N)nc2c1nc[nH]2

Properties
Chemical formula	C_{5}H_{6}N_{6}
Molar mass	150.145 g·mol^{−1}
Appearance	White to yellow crystalline powder
Density	1.743 g/cm^{3}
Melting point	117 to 122 °C (243 to 252 °F; 390 to 395 K)
Solubility in water	2.38 g/L at 20 °C
- Except where otherwise noted, data are given for materials in their standard state (at 25 °C [77 °F], 100 kPa). (what is ?) Infobox references

2,6-diaminopurine (2,6-DAP, also known as 2-aminoadenine, standard IUPAC symbol n^{2}A) is a compound once used in the treatment of leukemia. It is found instead of adenine (A) in the genetic material of some bacteriophage viruses,

In August 2011, a report, based on NASA studies with meteorites found on Earth, was published suggesting 2,6-diaminopurine and related organic molecules, including the DNA and RNA components adenine and guanine, may have been formed extraterrestrially in outer space.

== Abbreviations ==
In virology it is referred to as the "Z" base. However, "Z" refers instead to 6-amino-5-nitropyridin-2-one in the Artificially Expanded Genetic Information System (AEGIS), so context is required to differentiate. AEGIS refers to this base as "AminoA" instead.

It has also been called the "D" base, but the more common interpretation of "D" is dihydrouridine.

== In viruses ==
DiampurineT DNA base pair

In cyanophage S-2L (Siphoviridae), diaminopurine is used instead of adenine (host evasion). Diaminopurine base (Z) pairs perfectly with thymine (T) as it is identical to adenine (A) but has an amine group at position 2 forming 3 intermolecular hydrogen bonds, eliminating the major difference between the two types of basepairs (weak:A-T and strong:C-G). This improved stability affects protein-binding interactions that rely on those differences.

Four papers published April 2021 further describes the use and production of the Z-base. It is now known that:

- The S-2L phage avoids incorporating A bases in the genome by hydrolyzing dATP (DatZ enzyme);
- The Z base is produced by a pathway involving DUF550 (MazZ) and PurZ in S-2L and Vibrio phage PhiVC8;
- The PrimPol/AEP DNA polymerase responsible for handling the Z base occurs in the same gene cluster as the three aforementioned enzymes;
- The Z base is quite widespread in both Siphoviridae and Podoviridae, based on the occurrence of the said gene cluster.

In August 2021, it was shown that DatZ, MazZ and PurZ are sufficient to replace some occurrence of A by Z in the bacterial genome of E. coli; expression of this system is toxic to the cell. The structures of MazZ (subtype 2) and PurZ are also determined, showing a possible link between PurZ and archaeal versions of PurA.

== Biosynthesis ==
2-aminoadenine is produced in two steps. The enzyme MazZ (homologous to MazG, EC 3.6.1.8) first performs:

dGTP + H_{2}O = dGMP + diphosphate

The enzyme PurZ (homologous to PurA, EC 6.3.4.4) then performs:

(d)ATP + dGMP + L-aspartate = (d)ADP + phosphate + 2-aminodeoxyadenylosuccinate (dSMP)

The resulting dSMP is processed by host enzymes analogously to adenylosuccinate to produce dZTP.

== In cellular life ==
2,6-DAP was used to treat leukemia since as early as 1951. It is known to arrest progression of cell cycle in mouse leukemia cells by 1989. Cancer cells are known to become resistant to DAP by losing their adenine phosphoribosyltransferase (APRT) function, a process shared with E. coli.

DAP derivatives are in vitro antivirals useful against pseudorabies virus, a economically important livestock disease. This base, in its free form, is able to correct UGA nonsense mutations by encouraging translational readthrough, through the inhibition of FTSJ1.

== Bioengineering ==
In bioengineering, anti-miRNA oligonucleotides (specifically, the serinol nucleic acid [SNA] type) incorporating base Z instead of A show enhanced binding to RNA.

DAP is used similarly to other nuclear acid analogues in the investigation of enzyme structures and mechanisms.
