= C5H4N4 =

The molecular formula C_{5}H_{4}N_{4} may refer to:

- Purine
- Purine analogues
  5-Aza-7-deazapurine
- Pyridine analogues
  Triazolopyridine
  4-azidopyridine
