= Methylcytosine =

Methylcytosine may refer to:

- 5-Methylcytosine
- 1-Methylcytosine, a nucleic acid in Hachimoji DNA
- N(4)-Methylcytosine
- 6-Methylcytosine

== See also ==
- Cytosine
- Nucleic acid analogue
