= Arsenolipid =

Class of organoarsenic compound

Arsenolipids, also known as arsenic containing lipids, are organoarsenic containing lipids, which are naturally produced in marine environments from inorganic arsenic such as arsenite and arsenate ions.

== Structure and types ==
Over 50 structures of arsenolipid have been found, however, only some of them are found in the environment. These arsenolipids can be subcategorised further based on their structure into groups such as arsenic-containing fatty acids (AsFAs), arsenic-containing hydrocarbons (AsHCs) and arsenic glycophospholipids (AsPLs). These arsenolipids generally contain a two methyl groups bonded to the arsenic with a double bonded sulfur or oxygen.

Categorisation of arsenolipids
Name	Example diagram	Description
Arsenic-containing fatty acids (AsFA)	Structural diagrams of 2 types of AsFA	Dimethyl arsenoyl or thioxo equivalent bonded to the end of a fatty acid.
Arsenic-containing hydrocarbons (AsHC)	Structural diagram of 1‑dimethylarsinoylpentadecane, a type of AsHC	Dimethyl arsenoyl or thioxo equivalent bonded to a hydrocarbon.
Arsenic glycophospholipids (AsPL)		Dimethyl arsenoyl or thioxo equivalent bonded to a glycophospholipid.

== Occurrence and synthesis ==
Arsenolipids are thought to be produced in marine environments by algae and cyanbacterium either due to the detoxification of arsenate ions, or because of arsenics similarity to phosphorus, causing it to be mistakenly metabolised. These arsenolipids can then be passed further up the food chain to larger animals. Organophosphate containing arsenosugars can be converted into arsenosugar phospholipids by certain species of cyanobacterium such as members of the Synechocystis genus.

== Toxicity ==
Arsenolipids are proven to be toxic, with certain subclasses of them being shown to be possibly cytotoxic, predominately to bladder and intestinal cells, as well as being potentially neurotoxic. Arsenolipids containing a double bonded sulfur are thought to be more toxic due to higher lipophilicity than the oxygen equivalent.
