= XDNA =

Benzo-homologated DNA analogue

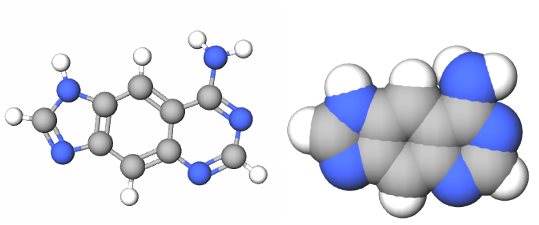

Benzo-homologated Adenine

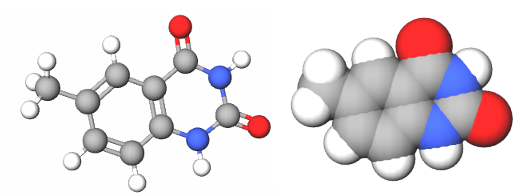

Benzo-homologated Thymine

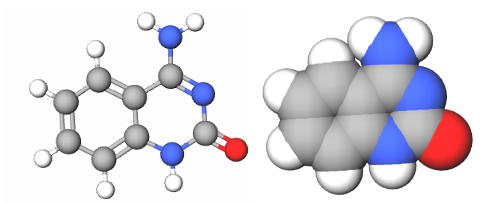

Benzo-homologated Cytosine

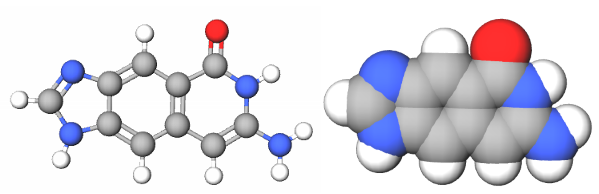

Benzo-homologated Guanine

xDNA (also known as expanded DNA or benzo-homologated DNA) is a size-expanded nucleotide system synthesized from the fusion of a benzene ring and one of the four natural bases: adenine, guanine, cytosine, and thymine. This size expansion produces an 8 letter alphabet which has a larger information storage capacity than natural DNA's (often referred to as B-DNA in literature) 4 letter alphabet. As with normal base-pairing, A pairs with xT, C pairs with xG, G pairs with xC, and T pairs with xA. The double helix is thus 2.4Å wider than a natural double helix. While similar in structure to B-DNA, xDNA has unique absorption, fluorescence, and stacking properties.

Initially synthesized as an enzyme probe by Nelson J. Leonard's group, benzo-homologated adenine was the first base synthesized. Later, Eric T. Kool's group finished synthesizing the remaining three expanded bases, eventually followed by yDNA ("wide" DNA), another benzo-homologated nucleotide system, and naphtho-homologated xxDNA and yyDNA. xDNA is more stable when compared to regular DNA when subjected to higher temperature, and while entire strands of xDNA, yDNA, xxDNA and yyDNA exist, they are currently difficult to synthesize and maintain. Experiments with xDNA provide new insight into the behavior of natural B-DNA. The extended bases xA, xC, xG, and xT are naturally fluorescent, and single strands composed of only extended bases can recognize and bind to single strands of natural DNA, making them useful tools for studying biological systems. xDNA is most commonly formed with base pairs between a natural and expanded nucleobase, however x-nucleobases can also be paired together. Current research supports xDNA as a viable genetic encoding system in the near future.

== Origins ==
The first nucleotide to be expanded was the purine adenine. Nelson J. Leonard and colleagues synthesized this original x-nucleotide, which was referred to as "expanded adenine". xA was used as a probe in the investigation of active sites of ATP-dependent enzymes, more specifically what modifications the substrate could take while still being functional. Almost two decades later, the other three bases were successfully expanded and later integrated into a double helix by Eric T. Kool and colleagues. Their goal was to create a synthetic genetic system which mimics and surpasses the functions of the natural genetic system, and to broaden the applications of DNA both in living cells and in experimental biochemistry. Once the expanded base set was created, the goal shifted to identifying or developing faithful replication enzymes and further optimizing the expanded DNA alphabet.

=== Synthesis ===
In benzo-homologated purines (xA and xG), the benzene ring is bound to the nitrogenous base through nitrogen-carbon (N-C) bonds. Benzo-homologated pyrimidines are formed through carbon-carbon (C-C) bonds between the base and the benzene. Thus far, x-nucleobases have been added to strands of DNA using phosphoramidite derivatives, as traditional polymerases have been unsuccessful in synthesizing strands of xDNA. X-nucleotides are poor candidates as substrates for B-DNA polymerases as their size interferes with binding at the catalytic domain. Attempts at using template-independent enzymes have been successful as they have a reduced geometric constraint for substrates. Terminal deoxynucleotidyl transferase (TdT) has been used previously to synthesize strands of bases which have been bound to fluorophores. Using TdT, up to 30 monomers can be combined to form a double-helix of xDNA, however this oligomeric xDNA appears to inhibit its own extension beyond this length due to the overwhelming hydrogen bonding. In order to minimize inhibition, xDNA can be hybridized into a regular helix.

=== Replication ===
For xDNA to be used as a substitute structure for information storage, it requires a reliable replication mechanism. Research into xDNA replication using a Klenow fragment from DNA polymerase I shows that a natural base partner is selectively added in instances of single-nucleotide insertion. However, DNA polymerase IV (Dpo4) has been able to successfully use xDNA for these types of insertions with high fidelity, making it a promising candidate for future research in extending replicates of xDNA. xDNA's mismatch sensitivity is similar to that of B-DNA.

== Structure ==
Chemical structure of dxA	Chemical structure of dxT	Chemical structure of dxC	Chemical structure of dxG
Adenine	Thymine	Cytosine	Guanine
Size-expanded xA	Size-expanded xT	Size-expanded xC	Size-expanded xG

Similar to natural bases, x-nucleotides selectively assemble into a duplex-structure resembling B-DNA. xDNA was originally synthesized by incorporating a benzene ring into the nitrogenous base. However, other expanded bases have been able to incorporate thiophene and benzo[b]thiophene as well. xDNA and yDNA use benzene rings to widen the bases and are thus termed "benzo-homologated". Another form of expanded nucleobases known as yyDNA incorporate naphthalene into the base and are "naptho-homologated". xDNA has a rise of 3.2Å and a twist of 32°, significantly smaller than B-DNA, which has a rise of 3.3Å and a twist of 34.2° xDNA nucleotides can occur on both strands—either alone (known as "doubly expanded DNA") or mixed with natural bases—or exclusively on one strand or the other. Similar to B-DNA, xDNA can recognize and bind complementary single-stranded DNA or RNA sequences.

Duplexes formed from xDNA are similar to natural duplexes aside from the distance between the two sugar-phosphate backbones. xDNA helices have a greater number of base pairs per turn of the helix as a result of a reduced distance between neighbour nucleotides. NMR spectra report that xDNA helices are anti-parallel, right-handed and take an anti conformation around the glycosidic bond, with a C2'-endo sugar pucker. Helices created from xDNA are more likely to take a B-helix over an A-helix conformation, and have an increased major groove width by 6.5Å (where the backbones are farthest apart) and decreased minor groove width by 5.5Å (where the backbones are closest together) compared to B-DNA. Altering groove width affects the xDNA's ability to associate with DNA-binding proteins, but as long as the expanded nucleotides are exclusive to one strand, recognition sites are sufficiently similar to B-DNA to allow bonding of transcription factors and small polyamide molecules. Mixed helices present the possibility of recognizing the four expanded bases using other DNA-binding molecules.

== Properties ==
Expanded nucleotides and their oligomeric helices share many properties with their natural B-DNA counterparts, including their pairing preference: A with T, C with G. The various differences in chemical properties between xDNA and B-DNA support the hypothesis that the benzene ring which expands x-nucleobases is not, in fact, chemically inert. xDNA is more hydrophobic than B-DNA, and also has a smaller HOMO–LUMO gap (distance between the highest occupied molecular orbital and lowest unoccupied molecular orbital) as a result of modified saturation. xDNA has higher melting temperatures than B-DNA (a mixed decamer of xA and T has a melting temperature of 55.6 °C, 34.3 °C higher than the same decamer of A and T), and exhibits an "all-or-nothing" melting behaviour.

=== Conformation ===
Under lab conditions, xDNA orients itself in the syn conformation. This unfortunately does not expose the binding face of the xDNA nucleotides to face the neighbouring strand for binding, meaning that extra measures must be applied to alter the conformation of xDNA before attempting to form helices. However, the anti and syn orientations are practically identical energetically in expanded bases. This conformational preference is seen primarily in pyrimidines, and purines display minimal preference for orientation.

=== Enhanced stacking ===
Stacking of the nucleotides in a double helix is a major determinant of the helix's stability. With the added surface area and hydrogen available for bonding, stacking potential for the nucleobases increases with the addition of a benzene spacer. By increasing the separation between the nitrogenous bases and either sugar-phosphate backbone, the helix's stacking energy is less variable and therefore more stable. The energies for natural nucleobase pairs vary from 18 to 52 kJ/mol. This variance is only 14–40 kJ/mol for xDNA.

Due to an increased overlap between and expanded strand of DNA and its neighbouring strand, there are greater interstrand interactions in expanded and mixed helices, resulting in a significant increase in the helix's stability. xDNA has enhanced stacking abilities resultant from changes in inter- and intrastrand hydrogen bonding that arise from the addition of a benzene spacer, but expanding the bases does not alter hydrogen's contribution to the stability of the duplex. These stacking abilities are exploited by helices consisting of both xDNA and B-DNA in order to optimize the strength of the helix. Increased stacking is seen most prominently in strands consisting only of A and xA and T and xT, as T-xA has stronger stacking interactions than T-A.

The energy resultant from pyrimidines ranges from 30 to 49 kJ/mol. The range for purines is between 40-58kJ/mol. By replacing one nucleotide in a double-helix with an expanded nucleotide, the strength of the stacking interactions increases by 50%. Expanding both nucleotides results in a 90% increase in stacking strength. While xG has an overall negative effect on the binding strength of the helix, the other three expanded bases outweigh this with their positive effects. The change in energy caused by expanding the bases is mostly dependent on the rotation of the bond about the nucleobases' centers of mass, and center of mass stacking interactions improve the stacking potential of the helix. Because the size-expanded bases widen the helix, it is more thermally stable with a higher melting temperature.

=== Absorption ===
The addition of a benzene spacer in x-nucleobases affects the bases' optical absorption spectra. Time-dependent density functional theory (TDDFT) applied to xDNA revealed that the benzene component of the highest occupied molecular orbitals (HOMO) in the x-bases pins the absorption onset at an earlier point than natural bases. Another unusual feature of xDNA absorption spectra is the red-shifted excimers of xA in the low range. In terms of stacking fingerprints, there is a more pronounced hypochromicity seen in consecutive xA-T base pairs.

Implications of xDNA's altered absorption include applications in nanoelectronic technology and nanobiotechnology. The reduced spacing between x-nucleotides makes the helix stiffer, thus it is not as easily affected by substrate, electrode, and functional nanoparticle forces. Other alterations to natural nucleotides resulting in different absorption spectra will broaden these applications in the future.

=== Fluorescence ===
One unique property of xDNA is its inherent fluorescence. Natural bases can be bound directly to fluorophores for use in microarrays, in situ hybridization, and polymorphism analysis. However, these fluorescent natural bases often fail as a result of self-quenching, which diminishes their fluorescent intensity and reduces their applicability as visual DNA tags. The pi interactions between the rings in x-nucleobases result in an inherent fluorescence in the violet-blue range, with a Stokes shift between 50 and 80 nm. They also have a quantum yield in the range of 0.3–0.6. xC has the greatest fluorescent emission.

== Other expanded bases ==
After the creation of and successful research surrounding xDNA, more forms of expanded nucleotides were investigated. yDNA is a second, similar system of nucleotides which uses a benzene ring to expand the four natural bases. xxDNA and yyDNA use naphthalene, a polycyclic molecule consisting of two hydrocarbon rings. The two rings expand the base even wider, further altering its chemical properties.

=== yDNA ===
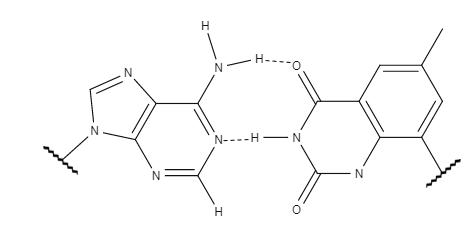
Adenine (left) bonded to x-thymine (right).

The success and implications of xDNA prompted research to examine other factors which could alter B-DNA's chemical properties and create a new system for information storage with broader applications. yDNA also uses a benzene ring, similar to xDNA, with the only difference being the site of addition of the aromatic ring. The location of the benzene ring changes the preferred structure of the expanded helix. The altered conformation makes yDNA more similar to B-DNA in its orientation by changing the interstrand hydrogen bonds. Stability is highly dependent on the bases' rotation about the link between the base and the sugar of the backbone. yDNA's altered preference for this orientation makes it more stable overall than xDNA. The location of the benzene spacer also affects the bases' groove geometry, altering neighbour interactions. The base pairs between y-nucleotides and natural nucleotides is planar, rather than slightly twisted as with xDNA. This decreases the rise of the helix even further than achieved by xDNA.

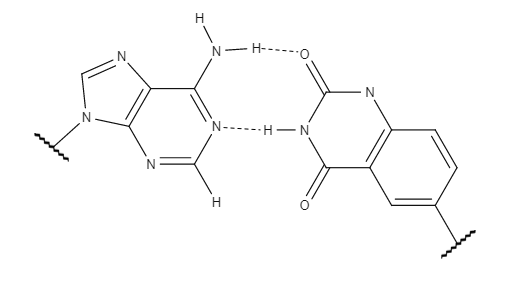
Adenine (left) bonded to y-thymine (right).

While xDNA and yDNA are quite similar in most properties, including their increased stacking interactions, yDNA shows superior mismatch recognition. y-pyrimidines display slightly stronger stacking interactions than x-pyrimidines as a result of the distance between the two anomeric carbons, which is slightly larger in yDNA. xDNA still has stronger stacking interactions in model helices, but adding either x- or y-pyrimidines to a natural double helix strengthens the intra- and interstrand interactions, increasing overall helix stability. In the end, which of the two has the strongest overall stacking interactions is dependent on the sequence; xT and yT bind A with similar strength, but the stacking energy of yC bound to G is stronger than xC by 4kJ/mol. yDNA and other expanded bases are part of a very young field which is highly understudied. Research suggest that the ideal conformation still remains to be discovered, but knowing that the benzene location affects the orientation and structure of expanded nucleobases adds information to their future design.

=== yyDNA and xxDNA ===
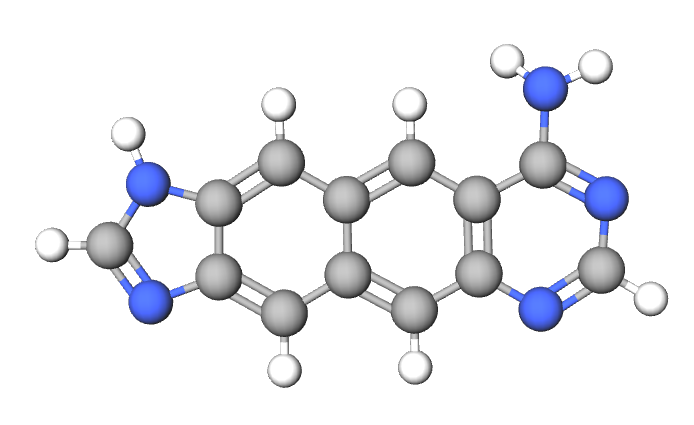
Naphtho-homologated Adenine (xxA)

Doubly-expanded (or naphtho-homologated) nucleobases incorporate a naphthalene spacer instead of a benzene ring, widening the base twice as much with its two-ringed structure. These structures (known as xxDNA and yyDNA) are 4.8Å wider than natural bases and were once again created as a result of Leonard's research on expanded adenine in ATP-dependent enzymes in 1984. No literature was published on these doubly-expanded bases for nearly three decades until 2013 when the first xxG was produced by Sharma, Lait, and Wetmore and incorporated along with xxA into a natural helix. Although very little research has been performed on xxDNA, xx-purine neighbours have already been shown to increase intrastrand stacking energy by up to 119% (as opposed to 62% in x-purines). xx-purine and pyrimidine interactions show an overall decrease in stacking energies, but the overall stability of duplexes including pyrimidines and xx-purines increases by 22%, more than twofold that of pyrimidines and x-purines.

== Uses ==
xDNA has many applications in chemical and biological research, including expanding upon applications of natural DNA, such as scaffolding. In order to create self-assembling nanostructures, a scaffold is needed as a sort of trellis to support the growth. DNA has been used as a means to this end in the past, but expanded scaffolds make larger scaffolds for more complex self-assembly an option. xDNA's electrical conduction properties also make it a prime candidate as a molecular wire, as its π-π interactions help it efficiently conduct electricity. Its 8-letter alphabet (A, T, C, G, xA, xT, xC, xG) gives it the potential to store 2^{n} times more states per sequence than DNA, where n is the number of bases in the sequence. For example, combining 6 nucleotides of with B-DNA yields 4096 possible sequences, whereas a combination of the same number of nucleotides created with xDNA yields 262,144 possible sequences. Additionally, xDNA can be used as a fluorescent probe at enzyme active sites, as was its original application by Leonard et al.

xDNA has also been applied to the study of protein-DNA interactions. Due to xDNA's natural fluorescing properties, it can easily be visualized in both lab and living conditions. xDNA is becoming more easy to create and oligomerize, and its high-affinity binding to complementary DNA and RNA sequences means that it can not only help locate these sequences floating around in the cell, but also when they are already interacting with other structures within the cell. xDNA also has potential applications in assays that employ TdT as it may improve reporters, and can be used as an affinity tag for interstrand bonding.

== See also ==
- DNA
- RNA
- DNA sequencing
- Genetic engineering
- Nanobiotechnology
- Nucleobase
- Hachimoji DNA
- Artificially Expanded Genetic Information System (AEGIS)
