= 6-Amino-5-nitropyridin-2-one =

Names
- Preferred IUPAC name 6-Amino-5-nitropyridin-2(1H)-one
- Other names 6-Amino-5-nitropyridin-2-one

Identifiers
CAS Number	211555-30-5
3D model (JSmol)	Interactive image
ChemSpider	9357814
PubChem CID	11182729
UNII	X4VR2ETN9S
CompTox Dashboard (EPA)	DTXSID70457865
- InChI: InChI=1S/C5H5N3O3/c6-5-3(8(10)11)1-2-4(9)7-5/h1-2H,(H3,6,7,9) Key: JFGLOZOVAGYLKU-UHFFFAOYSA-N
- SMILES: C1=CC(=O)NC(=C1[N+](=O)[O-])N

Properties
Chemical formula	C_{5}H_{5}N_{3}O_{3}
Molar mass	155.1
- Except where otherwise noted, data are given for materials in their standard state (at 25 °C [77 °F], 100 kPa). Infobox references

6-Amino-5-nitropyridin-2-one or 6-amino-5-nitro-2(1H)-pyridinone is a pyridine base. It is used as a nucleobase of hachimoji DNA, in which it pairs with 5-aza-7-deazaguanine.

Hydrogen bonding (dashed lines) between unnatural bases in hachimoji DNA
