= ATP diphosphatase =

Class of enzymes

Identifiers
- EC no.: 3.6.1.8
- CAS no.: 37289-25-1

Databases
- BRENDA: enzyme data
- ExPASy: NiceZyme view
- KEGG: enzyme entry
- MetaCyc: metabolic pathway
- Rhea: reactions
- PDB structures: RCSB PDB PDBe PDBsum
- Gene Ontology: AmiGO / QuickGO
Search
- PMC: articles
- PubMed: articles
- NCBI: proteins

ATP diphosphatase (EC 3.6.1.8) is an enzyme characterised from cobra venom that catalyzes the hydrolysis of adenosine triphosphate (ATP) to adenosine monophosphate and pyrophosphate (PP_{i}):

adenosine triphosphate
H_{2}O
PP_{i}
adenosine monophosphate

The enzyme also acts on other purine nucleosides and is dependent on calcium or magnesium as Ca^{2+} or Mg^{2+}.

This enzyme is a hydrolase, one acting on acid anhydrides in phosphorus-containing anhydrides. The systematic name of this enzyme class is ATP diphosphohydrolase (diphosphate-forming). Other names in use include ATPase, ATP pyrophosphatase, adenosine triphosphate pyrophosphatase, and ATP diphosphohydrolase [ambiguous].
