= Arsenosugar =

Class of organoarsenic compound

Arsenosugars, also known as arsenic-containing ribofuranosides, are a class of organoarsenic compound and ribose derivative predominantly found in algae, seaweed and marine animals.

== Structure ==
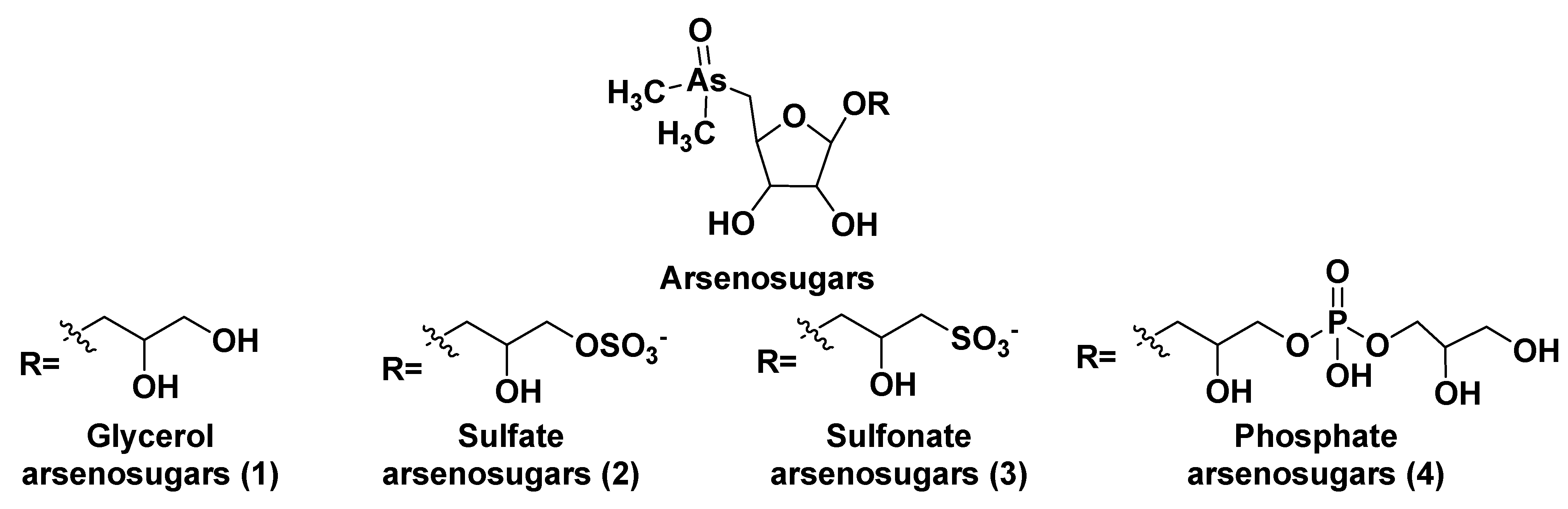
Chemical structure of oxo-arsenosugars and several common functional groups

There are several types of arsenosugar with the main ones being: oxo-, where an oxygen is double bonded to the arsenic; thio-, where a sulfur double bonds to the arsenic; and methyl-arsenosugars, where the arsenic atom is bonded to 2 or 3 methyl groups. The R-group represents an organic group with common groups including glycerol, sulfate, sulfonate and phosphate. There are a total of over 70 types of arsenosugars with a known structure.

== Occurrence and production ==
Arsenosugars were first isolated and identified in 1981 from Ecklonia radiata and are found predominantly in marine organisms. Arsenosugars are produced by some algae and bacteria, such as Synechocystis and Chlorella vulgaris which can convert inorganic arsenic, such as arsenite ions, into various organo-arsenic compounds including methlyarsenous acid and dimethylarsinous acid which then get converted to arsenosugars. Phosphate arsenosugars can then be further metabolised by intestinal microorganisms into arsenobetaine. Arsenosugars may also be converted into arsenolipids.

== Toxicity ==
Compared to many other organo-arsenic compounds, but similar to arsenobetaine, arsenosugars are generally non-toxic and pose less of a health concern to humans. However, some possible products of metabolism can be toxic, however, little research has been performed into their exact toxicities.
