= 5-Aza-7-deazaguanine =

Names
- Preferred IUPAC name 2-Aminoimidazo[1,2-a][1,3,5]triazin-4(8H)-one
- Other names 5-Aza-7-deazaguanine

Identifiers
CAS Number	67410-64-4
3D model (JSmol)	Interactive image
ChEMBL	ChEMBL3275938
ChemSpider	10205066
PubChem CID	135600909
UNII	662ZVV7ADX
CompTox Dashboard (EPA)	DTXSID30541537
- InChI: InChI=1S/C5H5N5O/c6-3-8-4-7-1-2-10(4)5(11)9-3/h1-2H,(H3,6,7,8,9,11) Key: KSTJOICDZAFYTD-UHFFFAOYSA-N
- SMILES: C1=CN2C(=O)NC(=NC2=N1)N

Properties
Chemical formula	C_{5}H_{5}N_{5}O
Molar mass	151.1261
- Except where otherwise noted, data are given for materials in their standard state (at 25 °C [77 °F], 100 kPa). Infobox references

5-Aza-7-deazaguanine or 2-aminoimidazo[1,2-a][1,3,5]triazin-4(1H)-one is a 5-aza-7-deazapurine base that is an isomer of guanine. It is used as a nucleobase of hachimoji DNA, in which it pairs with 6-amino-5-nitropyridin-2-one.

Hydrogen bonding (dashed lines) between unnatural bases in hachimoji DNA
