= Chemical evolution =

Chemical evolution may refer to:

- Abiogenesis, the transition from nonliving elements to living systems
- Astrochemistry, the study of the abundance and reactions of molecules in the universe, and their interaction with radiation
- Cosmochemistry, the study of the chemical compositions in the universe and the processes that led to them
- Evolution of metal ions in biological systems, incorporation of metallic ions into living organisms and how it has changed over time
- Gas evolution reaction, the process of a gas bubbling out from a solution
- Molecular evolution, evolution at the scale of molecules
- Oxygen evolution, the process of generating molecular oxygen through chemical reaction
- Stellar nucleosynthesis, the creation of chemical elements by stellar thermonuclear fusion or supernovae
