= FTSJ1 =

Protein-coding gene in humans

Identifiers
- Aliases: FTSJ1, CDLIV, MRX44, MRX9, SPB1, TRMT7, JM23, FtsJ RNA methyltransferase homolog 1 (E. coli), FtsJ RNA methyltransferase homolog 1, FtsJ RNA 2'-O-methyltransferase 1, XLID9
- External IDs: OMIM: 300499; MGI: 1859648; GeneCards: FTSJ1
Enzyme activity
EC #	BRENDA	ExPASy	KEGG	MetaCyc
2.1.1.205	↗	↗	↗	↗

Gene location (Human)
Chr.	X chromosome (human)
Band	Xp11.23	Start	48,476,021 bp
Band	Xp11.23	End	48,486,364 bp

Gene location (Mouse)
Chr.	X chromosome (mouse)
Band	X A1.1|X 3.73 cM	Start	8,104,907 bp
Band	X A1.1|X 3.73 cM	End	8,118,645 bp
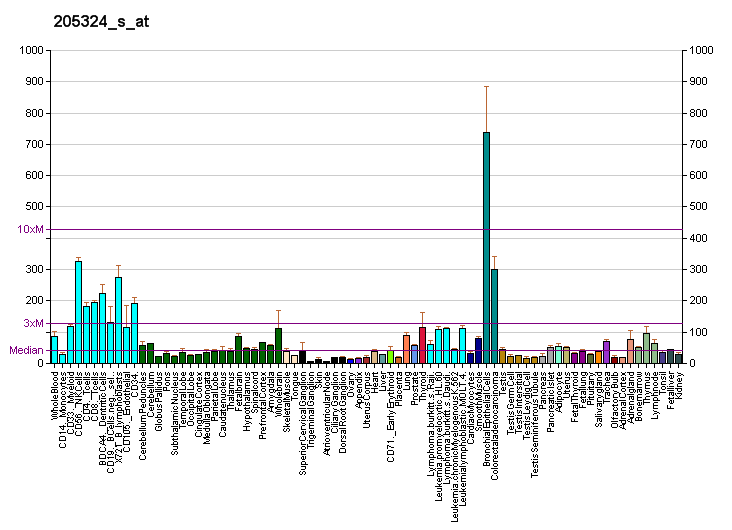

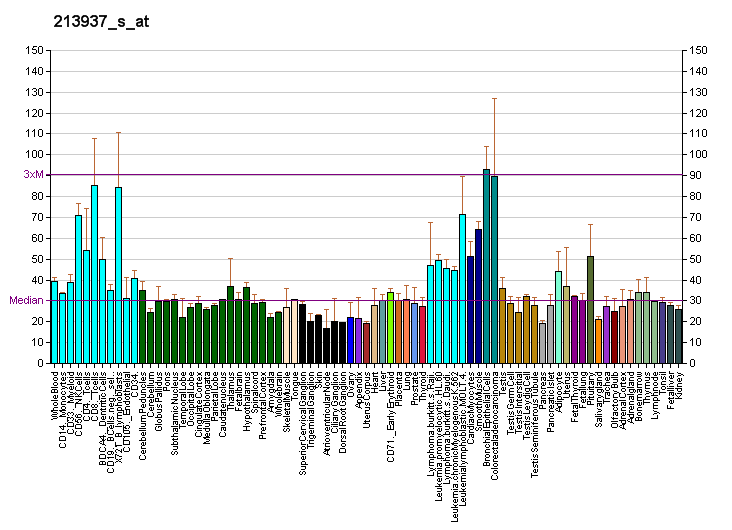
RNA expression pattern
Bgee	Human / Mouse (ortholog); Top expressed in: stromal cell of endometrium; granulocyte; body of pancreas; ganglionic eminence; left uterine tube; cerebellar hemisphere; right hemisphere of cerebellum; right lobe of thyroid gland; ascending aorta; left adrenal cortex / Top expressed in: genital tubercle; external carotid artery; internal carotid artery; fetal liver hematopoietic progenitor cell; crypt of lieberkuhn of small intestine; tail of embryo; medial ganglionic eminence; hair follicle; barrel cortex; left lobe of liver; More reference expression data
BioGPS	More reference expression data
Gene ontology
Molecular function	methyltransferase activity; transferase activity; tRNA (guanosine-2'-O-)-methyltransferase activity; tRNA (cytosine-2'-O-)-methyltransferase activity; tRNA methyltransferase activity
Cellular component	cytosol; cytoplasm
Biological process	methylation; RNA methylation; tRNA processing; tRNA modification; cytoplasmic translation; tRNA methylation; tRNA nucleoside ribose methylation
Sources:Amigo / QuickGO
Orthologs
Databases	NCBI: entry; OMA: entry
Species	Human	Mouse
Entrez	24140	54632
Ensembl	ENSG00000068438	ENSMUSG00000031171
UniProt	Q9UET6	n/a
RefSeq (mRNA)	NM_001282157; NM_012280; NM_177439	NM_001290430; NM_133991
RefSeq (protein)	NP_001269086; NP_036412; NP_803188	n/a
Location (UCSC)	Chr X: 48.48 – 48.49 Mb	Chr X: 8.1 – 8.12 Mb
PubMed search
- Wikidata
View/Edit Human	View/Edit Mouse

tRNA (cytidine(32)/guanosine(34)-2'-O)-methyltransferase is an enzyme that in humans is encoded by the FTSJ1 gene.

The protein encoded by this gene is a member of the S-adenosylmethionine-binding protein family. It is a nucleolar protein and may be involved in the processing and modification of rRNA. Three alternatively spliced transcript variants encoding different isoforms have been described for this gene.
