= 1-Methylcytosine =

Chemical compound

Names
- Preferred IUPAC name 4-Amino-1-methylpyrimidin-2(1H)-one

Identifiers
CAS Number	1122-47-0
3D model (JSmol)	Interactive image
ChEBI	CHEBI:39624
ChEMBL	ChEMBL500883
ChemSpider	71474
MeSH	1-Methylcytosine
PubChem CID	79143
UNII	1J54NE82RV
CompTox Dashboard (EPA)	DTXSID60149949
- InChI: InChI=1S/C5H7N3O/c1-8-3-2-4(6)7-5(8)9/h2-3H,1H3,(H2,6,7,9) Key: HWPZZUQOWRWFDB-UHFFFAOYSA-N; InChI=1S/C5H7N3O/c1-8-3-2-4(6)7-5(8)9/h2-3H,1H3,(H2,6,7,9) Key: HWPZZUQOWRWFDB-UHFFFAOYSA-N
- SMILES: CN1C=CC(=NC1=O)N

Properties
Chemical formula	C_{5}H_{7}N_{3}O
Molar mass	125.131 g·mol^{−1}
- Except where otherwise noted, data are given for materials in their standard state (at 25 °C [77 °F], 100 kPa). Infobox references

1-Methylcytosine (1mC) is a methylated form of the nucleic acid base cytosine. The deoxyribonucleoside it forms is called N^{1}-methyl-2'-deoxy-pseudocytidine (m^{1}ΨdC).

In 1-methylcytosine, a methyl group is attached to the 1st atom in the 6-atom ring. This methyl group distinguishes 1-methylcytosine from cytosine. The location distinguishes it from the more (naturally) common 5-methylcytosine.

1mC forms hydrogen bonds differently compared to cytosine because it attaches to the backbone sugar (ribose or deoxyribose) differently: at the C5 position as opposed to cytidine's C1 position, analogous to the difference between pseudouridine and uridine. It pairs with isoguanine in Artificially Expanded Genetic Information System (hachimoji) DNA, replacing the unstable deoxyribonucleoside form of isocytosine.

== History ==
Miriam Rossi worked on the refinement of the crystallographic structure of 1-methylcytosine.

It was discovered as a stable replacement for 2'-deoxy-5-methylisocytidine in 2009.
