= Isoguanine =

Names
- Preferred IUPAC name 6-Amino-1,9-dihydro-2H-purin-2-one
- Other names 2-Hydroxyadenine

Identifiers
CAS Number	3373-53-3
3D model (JSmol)	Interactive image
ChemSpider	69351
ECHA InfoCard	100.020.144
EC Number	222-157-6
PubChem CID	76900
UNII	E335PK4428
CompTox Dashboard (EPA)	DTXSID00187406
- InChI: InChI=1/C5H5N5O/c6-3-2-4(8-1-7-2)10-5(11)9-3/h1H,(H4,6,7,8,9,10,11) Key: DRAVOWXCEBXPTN-UHFFFAOYAU
- SMILES: O=C1\N=C2\N=C/NC2=C(\N1)N

Properties
Chemical formula	C_{5}H_{5}N_{5}O
Molar mass	151.1261
- Except where otherwise noted, data are given for materials in their standard state (at 25 °C [77 °F], 100 kPa). Infobox references

Isoguanine or 2-hydroxyadenine is a purine base that is an isomer of guanine. The nucleoside form is called isoguanosine (iG).

It is a product of oxidative damage to DNA in cultured E. coli and human cells. However, newer evidence shows that it mainly occurs in RNA and as the ribonucleoside instead of in DNA or as deoxyribonucleoside in living mammals, calling into question its link with DNA in vivo.

It can be mutagenic by causing mispairing, but does not hinder replication.

Isoguanine-Isocytosine-base-pair

It is also used in combination with isocytosine in studies of unnatural nucleic acid analogues of the normal base pairs in DNA. It is used as a nucleobase of hachimoji nucleic acids where it is given the abbreviation B. In hachimoji DNA, it pairs with 1-methylcytosine, while in hachimoji RNA, it pairs with isocytosine.
