= Nucleic acid analogue =

Compound analogous to naturally occurring RNA and DNA

Nucleic acid analogues are compounds which are structurally analogous to naturally occurring RNA and DNA, through substitutions of any of its sugar, phosphate, and nucleobase components. They are used in medicine and in molecular biology research.

== Overview ==
RNA with its nucleobases to the left and DNA to the right.

Nucleic acids are chains of nucleotides, which are composed of three parts: a backbone consisting of a pentose sugar of either ribose or deoxyribose, linked by phosphate groups; and one of four nucleobases. An analogue may have any of these altered. Typically the analogue nucleobases confer, among other things, different base pairing and base stacking properties. Examples include universal bases, which can pair with all four canonical bases, and phosphate-sugar backbone analogues such as PNA, which affect the properties of the chain (PNA can even form a triple helix).

== Backbone analogues ==
Nucleic acid analogues may have backbone substitutions to the sugar or phosphate components, or to both.

The polyelectrolyte theory of the gene proposes that a genetic molecule require a charged backbone to function.

=== Sugar analogues ===
Ribose's 2' hydroxy group reacts with the phosphate linked 3' hydroxy group, making RNA too unstable to be used or synthesized reliably. To overcome this, a ribose analogue can be used. The most common RNA analogues are 2'-O-methyl-substituted RNA, locked nucleic acid (LNA) or bridged nucleic acid (BNA), and peptide nucleic acid (PNA), as well as glycol nucleic acids (GNA), threose nucleic acids (TNA), and hexitol nucleic acids (HNA).

Although these oligonucleotides have a different backbone sugar—or, in the case of PNA, an amino acid residue in place of the ribose phosphate—they still bind to RNA or DNA according to Watson and Crick pairing while being immune to nuclease activity. They cannot be synthesized enzymatically and can only be obtained synthetically using the phosphoramidite strategy or, for PNA, other methods of peptide synthesis.

Dideoxynucleotides are used in sequencing. These nucleoside triphosphates possess a non-canonical sugar, dideoxyribose, which lacks the 3' hydroxyl group normally present in DNA and therefore cannot bond with the next base. The lack of the 3' hydroxyl group terminates the chain reaction as the DNA polymerases mistake it for a regular deoxyribonucleotide.

Another chain-terminating analogue that lacks a 3' hydroxyl and mimics adenosine is called cordycepin. Cordycepin is an anticancer drug that targets RNA replication. Another analogue in sequencing is a nucleobase analogue, 7-deaza-GTP and is used to sequence CG rich regions, instead 7-deaza-ATP is called tubercidin, an antibiotic.

Xeno nucleic acids represent one of the main pillars of xenobiology, the design of new-to-nature forms of life based on alternative biochemistries.

=== Phosphate analogues ===
Phosphate analogues include phosphorothioate nucleic acids and phosphorodiamidate nucleic acids.

=== Both ===
Chemical structure of Morpholino

Morpholino nucleic acids replace the sugar with a morpholine component, and the phosphate with a phosphorodiamidate component.

Miravirsen is an antisense drug candidate that incorporates both locked nucleic acid sugar components and phosphorothioate groups.

== Base analogues ==
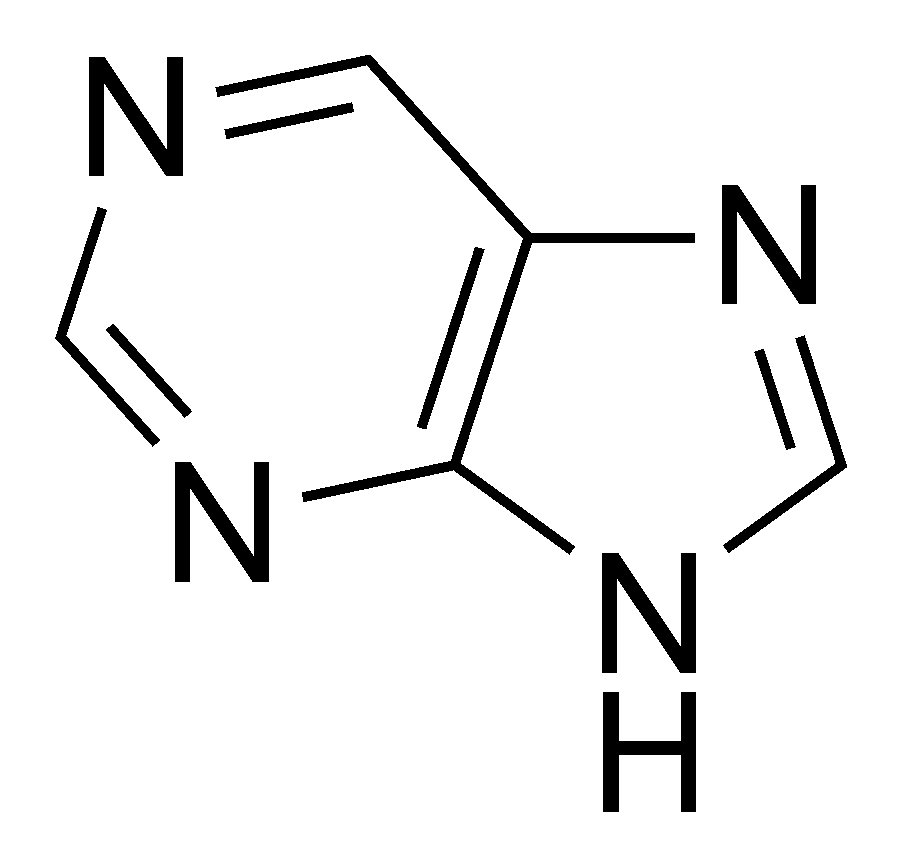
Purine

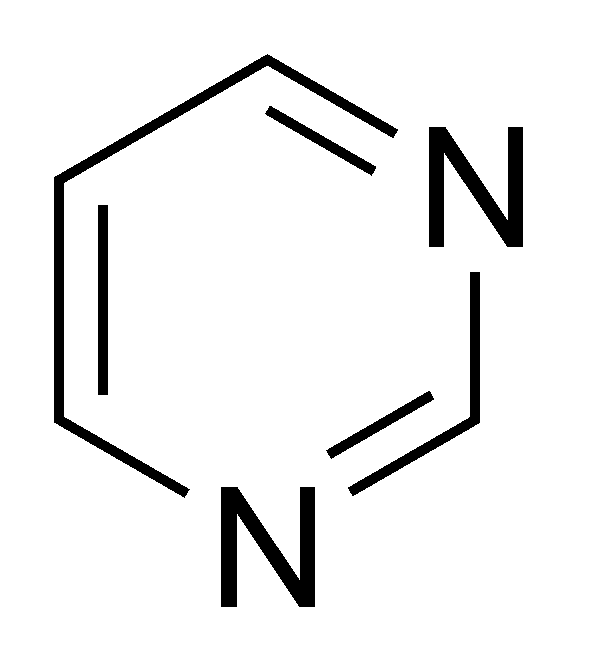
Pyrimidine

Naturally occurring bases can be divided into two classes according to their structure:

- Pyrimidines are six-membered heterocyclic with nitrogen atoms in position 1 and 3.
- Purines are bicyclic, consisting of a pyrimidine fused to an imidazole ring.

Artificial nucleotides (Unnatural Base Pairs (UBPs) named d5SICS UBP and dNaM UBP) have been inserted into bacterial DNA but these genes did not template mRNA or induce protein synthesis. The artificial nucleotides featured two fused aromatic rings which formed a (d5SICS–dNaM) complex mimicking the natural (dG–dC) base pair.

=== Mutagens ===
One of the most common base analogs is 5-bromouracil (5BU), the abnormal base found in the mutagenic nucleotide analog BrdU. When a nucleotide containing 5-bromouracil is incorporated into the DNA, it is most likely to pair with adenine; however, it can spontaneously shift into another isomer which pairs with a different nucleobase, guanine. If this happens during DNA replication, a guanine will be inserted as the opposite base analog, and in the next DNA replication, that guanine will pair with a cytosine. This results in a change in one base pair of DNA, specifically a transition mutation.

Additionally, nitrous acid (HNO_{2}) is a potent mutagen that acts on replicating and non-replicating DNA. It can cause deamination of the amino groups of adenine, guanine and cytosine. Adenine is deaminated to hypoxanthine, which base pairs to cytosine instead of thymine. Cytosine is deaminated to uracil, which base pairs with adenine instead of guanine. Deamination of guanine is not mutagenic. Nitrous acid-induced mutations also are induced to mutate back to wild-type.

=== Fluorophores ===
Structure of aminoallyl-uridine

Commonly fluorophores (such as rhodamine or fluorescein) are linked to the ring linked to the sugar (in para) via a flexible arm, presumably extruding from the major groove of the helix. Due to low processivity of the nucleotides linked to bulky adducts such as fluorophores by Taq polymerases, the sequence is typically copied using a nucleotide with an arm and later coupled with a reactive fluorophore (indirect labelling):

- Amine reactive: aminoallyl nucleotides contain a primary amine group on a linker that reacts with the amino-reactive dye such as cyanine or Alexa Fluor dyes, which contain a reactive leaving group like succinimidyl ester (NHS). Base-pairing amino groups are not affected.
- Thiol reactive: thiol-containing nucleotides react with the fluorophore linked to a reactive leaving group like maleimide.
- Biotin-linked nucleotides rely on the same indirect labelling principle (and fluorescent streptavidin) and are used in Affymetrix DNAchips.

Fluorophores find a variety of uses in medicine and biochemistry.

The most commonly used and commercially available fluorescent base analogue, 2-aminopurine (2-AP), has a high-fluorescence quantum yield free in solution (0.68) that is considerably reduced (appr. 100 times but highly dependent on base sequence) when incorporated into nucleic acids. The emission sensitivity of 2-AP to immediate surroundings is shared by other promising and useful fluorescent base analogues like 3-MI, 6-MI, 6-MAP, pyrrolo-dC (also commercially available), modified and improved derivatives of pyrrolo-dC, furan-modified bases and many other ones (see recent reviews). This sensitivity to the microenvironment has been utilized in studies of e.g. structure and dynamics within both DNA and RNA, dynamics and kinetics of DNA-protein interaction and electron transfer within DNA.

A newly developed and very interesting group of fluorescent base analogues that has a fluorescence quantum yield that is nearly insensitive to their immediate surroundings is the tricyclic cytosine family. 1,3-Diaza-2-oxophenothiazine, tC, has a fluorescence quantum yield of approximately 0.2 both in single- and in double-strands irrespective of surrounding bases. Also the oxo-homologue of tC called tC^{O} (both commercially available), 1,3-diaza-2-oxophenoxazine, has a quantum yield of 0.2 in double-stranded systems. However, it is somewhat sensitive to surrounding bases in single-strands (quantum yields of 0.14–0.41). The high and stable quantum yields of these base analogues make them very bright, and, in combination with their good base analogue properties (leaves DNA structure and stability next to unperturbed), they are especially useful in fluorescence anisotropy and FRET measurements, areas where other fluorescent base analogues are less accurate. Also, in the same family of cytosine analogues, a FRET-acceptor base analogue, tC_{nitro}, has been developed. Together with tC^{O} as a FRET-donor this constitutes the first nucleic acid base analogue FRET-pair ever developed. The tC-family has, for example, been used in studies related to polymerase DNA-binding and DNA-polymerization mechanisms.

=== Natural non-canonical bases ===
In a cell, there are several non-canonical bases present: CpG islands in DNA (often methylated), all eukaryotic mRNA (capped with a methyl-7-guanosine), and several bases of rRNAs (methylated). Often, tRNAs are heavily modified postranscriptionally in order to improve their conformation or base pairing, in particular in or near the anticodon: inosine can base pair with C, U, and even with A, whereas thiouridine (with A) is more specific than uracil (with a purine). Other common tRNA base modifications are pseudouridine (which gives its name to the TΨC loop), dihydrouridine (which does not stack as it is not aromatic), queuosine, wyosine, and so forth. Nevertheless, these are all modifications to normal bases and are not placed by a polymerase.

=== Base-pairing ===
Canonical bases may have either a carbonyl or an amine group on the carbons surrounding the nitrogen atom furthest away from the glycosidic bond, which allows them to base pair (Watson-Crick base pairing) via hydrogen bonds (amine with ketone, purine with pyrimidine). Adenine and 2-aminoadenine have one/two amine group(s), whereas thymine has two carbonyl groups, and cytosine and guanine are mixed amine and carbonyl (inverted in respect to each other).

Natural basepairs
A GC basepair: purine carbonyl/amine forms three intermolecular hydrogen bonds with pyrimidine amine/carbonyl	An AT basepair: purine amine/- forms two intermolecular hydrogen bonds with pyrimidine carbonyl/carbonyl

The precise reason why there are only four nucleotides is debated, but there are several unused possibilities. Furthermore, adenine is not the most stable choice for base pairing: in Cyanophage S-2L, diaminopurine (DAP) is used instead of adenine. Diaminopurine basepairs perfectly with thymine as it is identical to adenine but has an amine group at position 2 forming 3 intramolecular hydrogen bonds, eliminating the major difference between the two types of basepairs (weak A-T vs strong C-G). This improved stability affects protein-binding interactions that rely on those differences. Other combination include:

- Isoguanine and isocytosine, which have their amine and ketone inverted compared to standard guanine and cytosine. They are not used probably as tautomers are problematic for base pairing, but isoC and isoG can be amplified correctly with PCR even in the presence of the 4 canonical bases.
- Diaminopyrimidine and xanthine, which bind like 2-aminoadenine and thymine but with inverted structures. This pair is not used as xanthine is a deamination product.

Unused basepair arrangements
A DAP-T base: purine amine/amine forms three intermolecular hydrogen bonds with pyrimidine ketone/ketone	An X-DAP base: purine ketone/ketone forms three intermolecular hydrogen bonds with pyrimidine amine/amine	A iG-iC base: purine amine/ketone forms three intermolecular hydrogen bonds with pyrimidine ketone/amine

However, correct DNA structure can form even when the bases are not paired via hydrogen bonding; that is, the bases pair thanks to hydrophobicity, as studies have shown with DNA isosteres (analogues with same number of atoms) such as the thymine analogue 2,4-difluorotoluene (F) or the adenine analogue 4-methylbenzimidazole (Z). An alternative hydrophobic pair could be isoquinoline and pyrrolo[2,3-b]pyridine.

Other noteworthy basepairs:

- Several fluorescent bases have also been made, such as the 2-amino-6-(2-thienyl)purine and pyrrole-2-carbaldehyde base pair.
- Metal-coordinated bases, such as pairing between a pyridine-2,6-dicarboxylate (tridentate ligand) and a pyridine (monodentate ligand) through square planar coordination to a central copper ion.
- Universal bases may pair indiscriminately with any other base, but, in general, lower the melting temperature of the sequence considerably; examples include 2'-deoxyinosine (hypoxanthine deoxynucleotide) derivatives, nitroazole analogues, and hydrophobic aromatic non-hydrogen-bonding bases (strong stacking effects). These are used as proof of concept and, in general, are not utilized in degenerate primers (which are a mixture of primers).
- The numbers of possible base pairs is doubled when xDNA is considered. xDNA contains expanded bases, in which a benzene ring has been added, which may pair with canonical bases, resulting in four additional possible base-pairs (xA-T, xT-A, xC-G, xG-C) with eight bases (or 16 bases if the unused arrangements are used). Another form of benzene added bases is yDNA, in which the base is widened by the benzene.

Novel basepairs with special properties
A F-Z base: methylbenzimidazole does not form intermolecular hydrogen bonds with toluene F/F	An S-Pa base: purine thienyl/amine forms three intermolecular hydrogen bonds with pyrrole -/carbaldehyde	An xA-T base: same bonding as A-T

==== Metal base-pairs ====
In metal base-pairing, the Watson-Crick hydrogen bonds are replaced by the interaction between a metal ion with nucleosides acting as ligands. The possible geometries of the metal that would allow for duplex formation with two bidentate nucleosides around a central metal atom are tetrahedral, dodecahedral, and square planar. Metal-complexing with DNA can occur by the formation of non-canonical base pairs from natural nucleobases with participation by metal ions and also by the exchanging the hydrogen atoms that are part of the Watson-Crick base pairing by metal ions. Introduction of metal ions into a DNA duplex has shown to have potential magnetic or conducting properties, as well as increased stability.

Metal complexing has been shown to occur between natural nucleobases. A well-documented example is the formation of T-Hg-T, which involves two deprotonated thymine nucleobases that are brought together by Hg^{2+} and forms a connected metal-base pair. This motif does not accommodate stacked Hg^{2+} in a duplex due to an intrastrand hairpin formation process that is favored over duplex formation. Two thymines across from each other do not form a Watson-Crick base pair in a duplex; this is an example where a Watson-Crick basepair mismatch is stabilized by the formation of the metal-base pair. Another example of a metal complexing to natural nucleobases is the formation of A-Zn-T and G-Zn-C at high pH; Co^{2+} and Ni^{2+} also form these complexes. These are Watson-Crick base pairs where the divalent cation in coordinated to the nucleobases. The exact binding is debated.

A large variety of artificial nucleobases have been developed for use as metal base pairs. These modified nucleobases exhibit tunable electronic properties, sizes, and binding affinities that can be optimized for a specific metal. For example, a nucleoside modified with a pyridine-2,6-dicarboxylate has shown to bind tightly to Cu^{2+}, whereas other divalent ions are only loosely bound. The tridentate character contributes to this selectivity. The fourth coordination site on the copper is saturated by an oppositely arranged pyridine nucleobase. The asymmetric metal base pairing system is orthogonal to the Watson-Crick base pairs. Another example of an artificial nucleobase is that with hydroxypyridone nucleobases, which are able to bind Cu^{2+} inside the DNA duplex. Five consecutive copper-hydroxypyridone base pairs were incorporated into a double strand, which were flanked by only one natural nucleobase on both ends. EPR data showed that the distance between copper centers was estimated to be 3.7 ± 0.1 Å, while a natural B-type DNA duplex is only slightly larger (3.4 Å). The appeal for stacking metal ions inside a DNA duplex is the hope to obtain nanoscopic self-assembling metal wires, though this has not been realized yet.

==== Unnatural base pair (UBP) ====
An unnatural base pair (UBP) is a designed subunit (or nucleobase) of DNA that is created in a laboratory and does not occur in nature. In 2012, a group of American scientists led by Floyd Romesberg, a chemical biologist at the Scripps Research Institute in San Diego, California, published that his team had designed two unnatural base pairs named d5SICS and dNaM. More technically, these artificial nucleotides bearing hydrophobic nucleobases feature two fused aromatic rings that form a d5SICS–dNaM complex or base pair in DNA. In 2014, the same team reported that they had synthesized a plasmid containing natural T-A and C-G base pairs along with the best-performing UBP Romesberg's laboratory had designed and inserted it into cells of the common bacterium E. coli, which successfully replicated the unnatural base pairs through multiple generations. This is the first known example of a living organism passing along an expanded genetic code to subsequent generations. This was in part achieved by the addition of a supportive algal gene that expresses a nucleotide triphosphate transporter which efficiently imports the triphosphates of both d5SICSTP and dNaMTP into E. coli bacteria. Then, the natural bacterial replication pathways use them to accurately replicate the plasmid containing d5SICS–dNaM.

The successful incorporation of a third base pair is a significant breakthrough toward the goal of greatly expanding the number of amino acids which can be encoded by DNA, from the existing 20 amino acids to a theoretically possible 172, thereby expanding the potential for living organisms to produce novel proteins. Earlier, the artificial strings of DNA did not encode for anything, but scientists speculated they could be designed to manufacture new proteins which could have industrial or pharmaceutical uses. Transcription of DNA containing unnatural base pairs and translation of corresponding mRNA were actually achieved recently. In November 2017, the same team at the Scripps Research Institute that first introduced two extra nucleobases into bacterial DNA reported having constructed a semi-synthetic E. coli bacteria able to make proteins using such DNA. Its DNA contained six different nucleobases: four canonical and two artificially added, dNaM and dTPT3 (these two form a pair). The bacteria had two corresponding RNA bases included in two new codons, additional tRNAs recognizing these new codons (these tRNAs also contained two new RNA bases within their anticodons) and additional amino acids, enabling the bacteria to synthesize "unnatural" proteins.

Another demonstration of UBPs were achieved by Ichiro Hirao's group at RIKEN institute in Japan. In 2002, they developed an unnatural base pair between 2-amino-8-(2-thienyl)purine (s) and pyridine-2-one (y) that functions in vitro in transcription and translation, for the site-specific incorporation of non-standard amino acids into proteins. In 2006, they created 7-(2-thienyl)imidazo[4,5-b]pyridine (Ds) and pyrrole-2-carbaldehyde (Pa) as a third base pair for replication and transcription. Afterward, Ds and 4-[3-(6-aminohexanamido)-1-propynyl]-2-nitropyrrole (Px) was discovered as a high fidelity pair in PCR amplification. In 2013, they applied the Ds-Px pair to DNA aptamer generation by in vitro selection (SELEX) and demonstrated the genetic alphabet expansion significantly augment DNA aptamer affinities to target proteins.

== Applications ==
=== Medicine ===
Several nucleoside analogues are used as antiviral or anticancer agents. The viral polymerase incorporates these compounds with non-canonical bases. These compounds are activated in the cells by being converted into nucleotides, they are administered as nucleosides since charged nucleotides cannot easily cross cell membranes.

=== Molecular biology ===
Common changes in nucleotide analogues

Nucleic acid analogues are used in molecular biology for several purposes:

- Investigation of possible scenarios of the origin of life: By testing different analogs, researchers try to answer the question of whether life's use of DNA and RNA was selected over time due to its advantages, or if they were chosen by arbitrary chance;
- As a tool to detect particular sequences: XNA can be used to tag and identify a wide range of DNA and RNA components with high specificity and accuracy;
- As an enzyme acting on DNA, RNA and XNA substrates - XNA has been shown to have the ability to cleave and ligate DNA, RNA and other XNA molecules similar to the actions of RNA ribozymes;
- As a tool with resistance to RNA hydrolysis;
- Investigation of the mechanisms used by enzyme; and
- Investigation of the structural features of nucleic acids.

=== Precursors to the RNA world ===
It has been suggested that the RNA world may have been preceded by an "RNA-like world" where other nucleic acids with a different backbone, such as GNA, PNA, and TNA existed, however, evidence for this hypothesis been called "tenuous".

=== Orthogonal system ===
The possibility has been proposed and studied, both theoretically and experimentally, of implementing an orthogonal system inside cells independent of the cellular genetic material in order to make a completely safe system, with the possible increase in encoding potentials. Several groups have focused on different aspects:

- Novel backbones and base pairs as discussed above;
- XNA artificial replication and transcription polymerases starting generally from T7 RNA polymerase;
- 16S ribosomal sequences with altered anti-Shine-Dalgarno sequences allowing the translation of only orthogonal mRNA with a matching altered Shine-Dalgarno sequence; and
- Novel tRNA encoding non-natural aminoacids for an expanded genetic code.

In May 2014, researchers announced that they had successfully introduced two new artificial nucleotides into bacterial DNA, and by including individual artificial nucleotides in the culture media, were able to passage the bacteria 24 times; they did not create mRNA or proteins able to use the artificial nucleotides. The artificial nucleotides featured 2 fused aromatic rings.

== See also ==
- Aptamer – Oligonucleotide or peptide molecules that bind specific targets
- Biotin
- Dark quencher
- Deoxyribozyme
- Expanded genetic code
- Fluorophore
- Genetics
- Molecular biology
- Nucleic acid
- Nucleobase
- Nucleoside
- Nucleotide
- Oligonucleotide synthesis
- Ribozyme
- Synthetic biology
- Xenobiology
- xDNA
- Hachimoji DNA
- Artificially Expanded Genetic Information System (AEGIS)
- Xeno nucleic acid
