= Isocytosine =

Chemical compound that is an isomer of cytosine

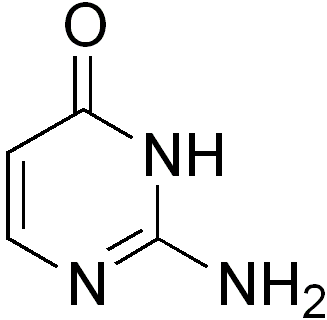

Names
- Preferred IUPAC name 2-Amino-3H-pyrimidin-4-one
- Other names 2-Aminouracil

Identifiers
CAS Number	108-53-2
3D model (JSmol)	Interactive image
ChEBI	CHEBI:55502
ChEMBL	ChEMBL56260
ChemSpider	60309
ECHA InfoCard	100.003.266
PubChem CID	66950
CompTox Dashboard (EPA)	DTXSID00148350
- InChI: InChI=1S/C4H5N3O/c5-4-6-2-1-3(8)7-4/h1-2H,(H3,5,6,7,8) Key: XQCZBXHVTFVIFE-UHFFFAOYSA-N; InChI=1/C4H5N3O/c5-4-6-2-1-3(8)7-4/h1-2H,(H3,5,6,7,8) Key: XQCZBXHVTFVIFE-UHFFFAOYAD
- SMILES: O=C1/C=C\N=C(\N)N1

Properties
Chemical formula	C_{4}H_{5}N_{3}O
Molar mass	111.104 g·mol^{−1}
- Except where otherwise noted, data are given for materials in their standard state (at 25 °C [77 °F], 100 kPa). verify (what is ?) Infobox references

Isocytosine or 2-aminouracil is a pyrimidine base that is an isomer of cytosine. The nucleoside form is called isocytidine (iC).

It is used in combination with isoguanine in studies of unnatural nucleic acid analogues of the normal base pairs in DNA. In particular, it is used as a nucleobase of hachimoji RNA with the abbreviation rS.

Isoguanine-Isocytosine-base-pair

== Synthesis ==
It can be synthesized from guanidine and malic acid.

Synthesis of isocytosine from malic acid

Isocytosine can also be obtained by condensing guanidine hydrochloride with 3-oxopropanoic acid. However, the C_{3} component is not storable in this case and was, therefore, replaced with malic acid. This is decarbonylated in concentrated sulfuric acid with elimination of water, thus losing carbon monoxide. The 3-oxopropanoic acid formed in situ condenses with the guanidine in the sulfuric acid solution with double elimination of water.

== Uses ==
It is also used in physical chemical studies involving metal complex binding, hydrogen bonding, and tautomerism and proton transfer effects in nucleobases.

Tautomerism of isocytosine
