= Synthetic genomics =

Field of synthetic biology

Synthetic genomics is a nascent field of synthetic biology that uses aspects of genetic modification on pre-existing life forms, or artificial gene synthesis to create new DNA or entire lifeforms.

== Overview ==
Synthetic genomics is unlike genetic modification in the sense that it does not use naturally occurring genes in lifeforms. It may make use of custom designed base pair series, though in a more expanded and presently unrealized sense synthetic genomics could utilize genetic codes that are not composed of the two base pairs of DNA that are currently used by life.

The development of synthetic genomics is related to certain recent technical abilities and technologies in the field of genetics. The ability to construct long base pair chains cheaply and accurately on a large scale has allowed researchers to perform experiments on genomes that do not exist in nature. Coupled with the developments in protein folding models and decreasing computational costs the field of synthetic genomics is beginning to enter a productive stage of vitality.

== Recombinant DNA technology ==
Soon after the discovery of restriction endonucleases and ligases, the field of genetics began using these molecular tools to assemble artificial sequences from smaller fragments of synthetic or naturally occurring DNA. The advantage in using the recombinatory approach as opposed to continual DNA synthesis stems from the inverse relationship that exists between synthetic DNA length and percent purity of that synthetic length. In other words, as you synthesize longer sequences, the number of error-containing clones increases due to the inherent error rates of current technologies. Although recombinant DNA technology is more commonly used in the construction of fusion proteins and plasmids, several techniques with larger capacities have emerged, allowing for the construction of entire genomes.

=== Polymerase cycling assembly ===
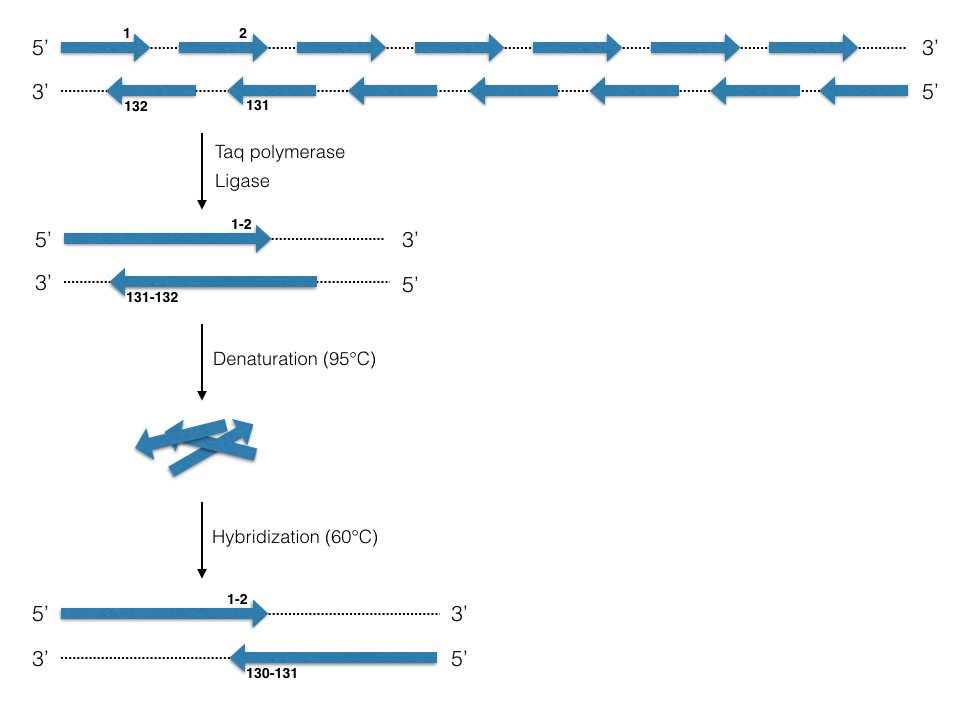
Polymerase Cycling Assembly. Blue arrows represent oligonucleotides 40 to 60 bp with overlapping regions of about 20 bp. The cycle is repeated until the final genome is constructed.

Polymerase cycling assembly (PCA) uses a series of oligonucleotides (or oligos), approximately 40 to 60 nucleotides long, that altogether constitute both strands of the DNA being synthesized. These oligos are designed such that a single oligo from one strand contains a length of approximately 20 nucleotides at each end that is complementary to sequences of two different oligos on the opposite strand, thereby creating regions of overlap. The entire set is processed through cycles of: (a) hybridization at 60 °C; (b) elongation via Taq polymerase and a standard ligase; and (c) denaturation at 95 °C, forming progressively longer contiguous strands and ultimately resulting in the final genome. PCA was used to generate the first synthetic genome in history, that of the Phi X 174 virus.

=== Gibson assembly method ===
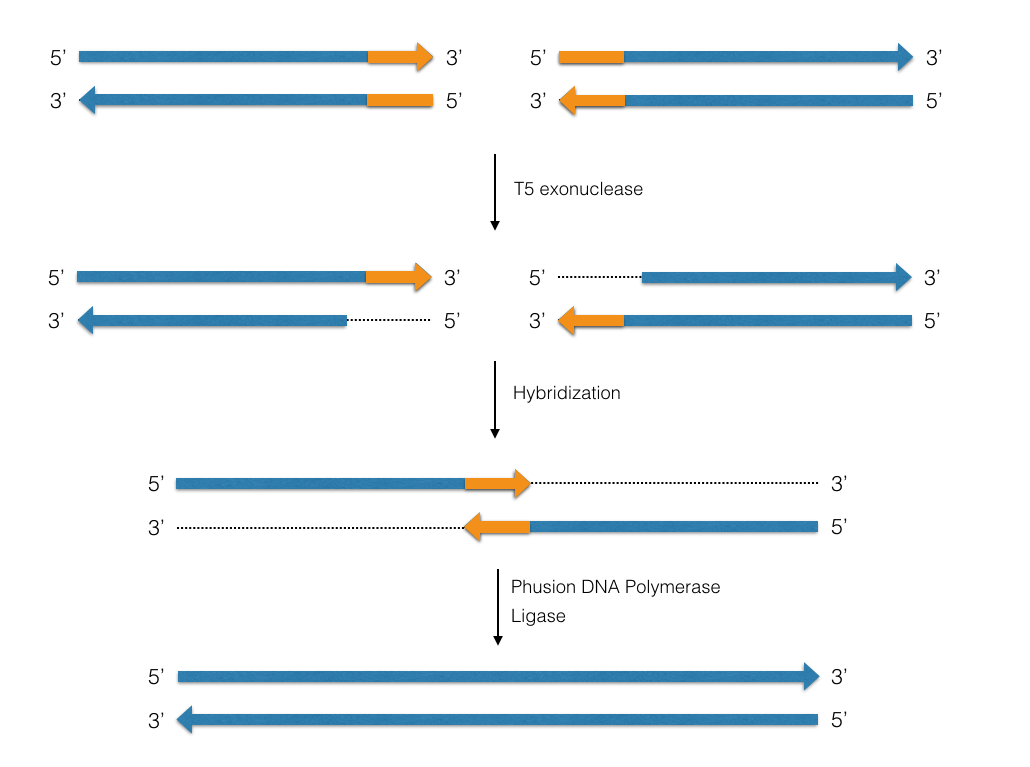
Gibson assembly method. The blue arrows represent DNA cassettes, which could be any size, 6 kb each for example. The orange segments represent areas of identical DNA sequences. This process can be carried out with multiple initial cassettes.

The Gibson assembly method, designed by Daniel Gibson during his time at the J. Craig Venter Institute, requires a set of double-stranded DNA cassettes that constitute the entire genome being synthesized. Note that cassettes differ from contigs by definition, in that these sequences contain regions of homology to other cassettes for the purposes of recombination. In contrast to Polymerase Cycling Assembly, Gibson Assembly is a single-step, isothermal reaction with larger sequence-length capacity; ergo, it is used in place of Polymerase Cycling Assembly for genomes larger than 6 kb.

A T5 exonuclease performs a chew-back reaction at the terminal segments, working in the 5' to 3' direction, thereby producing complementary overhangs. The overhangs hybridize to each other, a Phusion DNA polymerase fills in any missing nucleotides and the nicks are sealed with a ligase. However, the genomes capable of being synthesized using this method alone is limited because as DNA cassettes increase in length, they require propagation in vitro in order to continue hybridizing; accordingly, Gibson assembly is often used in conjunction with transformation-associated recombination (see below) to synthesize genomes several hundred kilobases in size.

=== Transformation-associated recombination ===
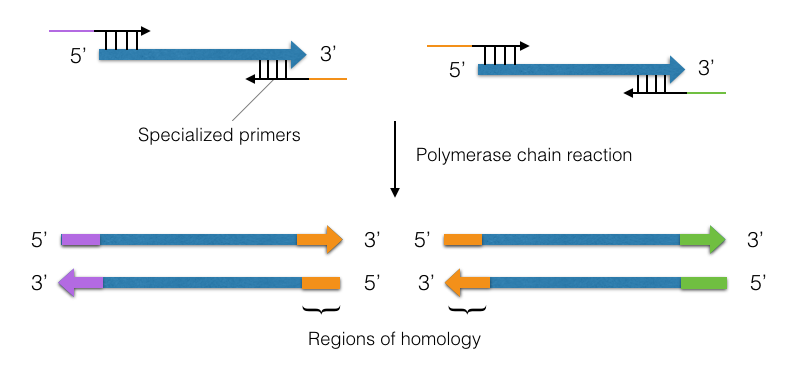
Gap Repair Cloning. The blue arrows represent DNA contigs. Segments of the same colour represent complementary or identical sequences. Specialized primers with extensions are used in a polymerase chain reaction to generate regions of homology at the terminal ends of the DNA contigs.

The goal of transformation-associated recombination (TAR) technology in synthetic genomics is to combine DNA contigs by means of homologous recombination performed by the yeast artificial chromosome (YAC). Of importance is the CEN element within the YAC vector, which corresponds to the yeast centromere. This sequence gives the vector the ability to behave in a chromosomal manner, thereby allowing it to perform homologous recombination.

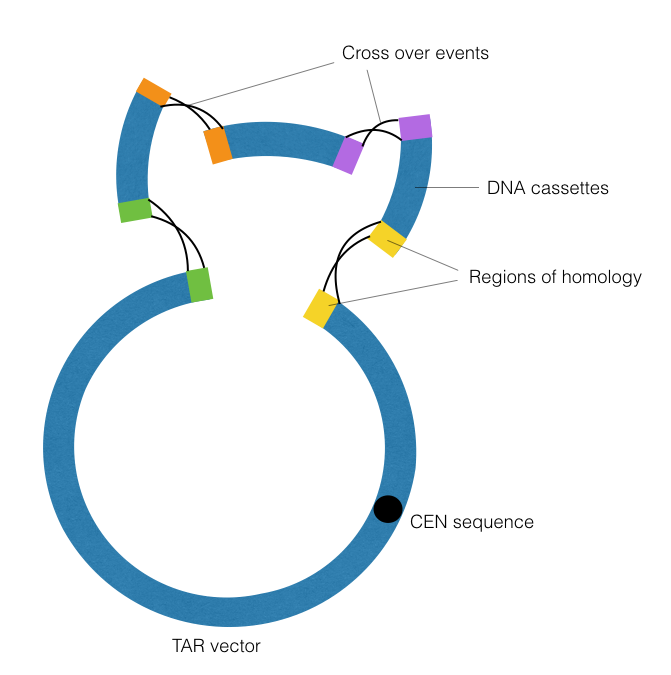
Transformation-Associated Recombination. Cross over events occur between regions of homology across the cassettes and YAC vector, thereby connecting the smaller DNA sequences into one larger contig.

First, gap repair cloning is performed to generate regions of homology flanking the DNA contigs. Gap Repair Cloning is a particular form of the polymerase chain reaction in which specialized primers with extensions beyond the sequence of the DNA target are utilized. Then, the DNA cassettes are exposed to the YAC vector, which drives the process of homologous recombination, thereby connecting the DNA cassettes. Polymerase Cycling Assembly and TAR technology were used together to construct the 600 kb Mycoplasma genitalium genome in 2008, the first synthetic organism ever created. Similar steps were taken in synthesizing the larger Mycoplasma mycoides genome a few years later.

== Full genomes and viable organisms ==
Researchers were able to create a synthetic organism for the first time in 2010. This breakthrough was undertaken by Synthetic Genomics, Inc., which continues to specialize in the research and commercialization of custom designed genomes. This "Mycoplasma laboratorium" (Synthia) project consists of a 600 kbp genome (resembling that of Mycoplasma mycoides, save the insertion of a few watermarks) via the Gibson Assembly method and Transformation Associated Recombination. It was inserted into a DNA-free shell of Mycoplasma capricolum to produce a living, dividing bacterium. This line has since been further minimized and improved.

In May 2019, a full E. coli genome modified to only use 61 out of 64 possible codons called Syn61 was synthesized. It was assembled by bacterial conjugation resulting in a lineage of living, dividing bacteria.

In April 2019, scientists at ETH Zurich modified a Caulobacter crescentus genome using computer algorithms to map out the entire genome's structure optimising it for stability, function, and ease of synthesis. They call the result "Caulobacter ethensis 2.0", but although full DNA genomic molecules were produced, they did not succeed in creating a living, dividing bacterial cell containing this genome. If they end up succeeding in creating a viable version in the future, it would prove to be a major step in customizing the genomes of microorganisms in fields such as medicine, energy and environmental science. A 2021 paper analyzes the differences in gene transcription between the natural genome and the synthetic version, suggesting ways to make a synthetic genome work. Many supposedly neutral mutations introduced by the computer turned out to change previously unknown regulatory systems.

In 2025, researchers reported that they had created a new "Syn57" strain of E. coli, which removes the use of 7 out of 64 codons completely.

== Unnatural base pair (UBP) ==
An unnatural base pair (UBP) is a designed subunit (or nucleobase) of DNA which is created in a laboratory and does not occur in nature. In 2012, a group of American scientists led by Floyd E. Romesberg, a chemical biologist at the Scripps Research Institute in San Diego, California, published that his team designed an unnatural base pair (UBP). The two new artificial nucleotides or Unnatural Base Pair (UBP) were named d5SICS and dNaM. More technically, these artificial nucleotides bearing hydrophobic nucleobases, feature two fused aromatic rings that form a (d5SICS–dNaM) complex or base pair in DNA. In 2014 the same team from the Scripps Research Institute reported that they synthesized a stretch of circular DNA known as a plasmid containing natural T-A and C-G base pairs along with the best-performing UBP Romesberg's laboratory had designed, and inserted it into cells of the common bacterium E. coli that successfully replicated the unnatural base pairs through multiple generations. This is the first known example of a living organism passing along an expanded genetic code to subsequent generations. This was in part achieved by the addition of a supportive algal gene that expresses a nucleotide triphosphate transporter which efficiently imports the triphosphates of both d5SICSTP and dNaMTP into E. coli bacteria. Then, the natural bacterial replication pathways use them to accurately replicate the plasmid containing d5SICS–dNaM.

The successful incorporation of a third base pair is a significant breakthrough toward the goal of greatly expanding the number of amino acids which can be encoded by DNA, from the existing 20 amino acids to a theoretically possible 172, thereby expanding the potential for living organisms to produce novel proteins. The artificial strings of DNA do not encode for anything yet, but scientists speculate they could be designed to manufacture new proteins which could have industrial or pharmaceutical uses.

== See also ==
- Artificial gene synthesis
- Artificially Expanded Genetic Information System
- Bioroid
- Genetic engineering
- Hachimoji DNA
- Synthetic biological circuit
- Synthetic genomes
