= Daniel G. Gibson =

American scientist

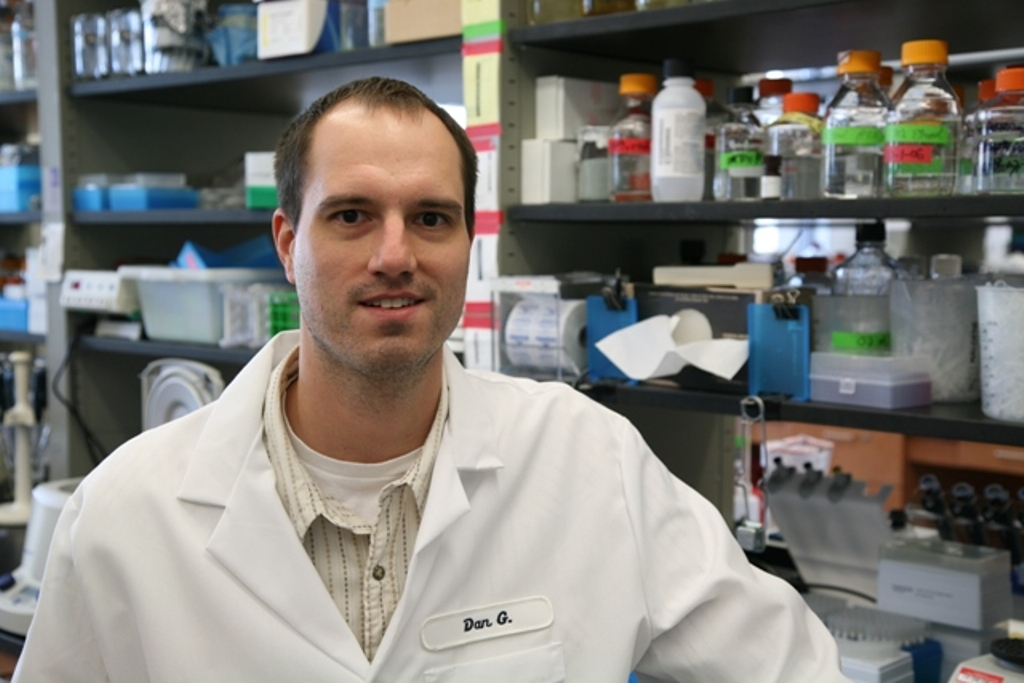
- Daniel G. Gibson shown in the laboratory following the construction of the synthetic genome in 2008
- Born: November 28, 1976 (age 49)
- Education: University at Buffalo (BS); University of Southern California (PhD)
- Known for: Gibson assembly
- Awards: TIME 100 reader poll (2011); George W. Thorn Award (2012); SynBioBeta Foundational Technology Award (2016); Newsweek America's Greatest Disruptors (2021)
- Scientific career
- Fields: Molecular biology, synthetic biology

Daniel G. Gibson is an American molecular biologist, genome engineer, inventor, and biotechnology executive. He has made numerous contributions to the field of synthetic biology through his development of methods for DNA synthesis, DNA assembly, and the construction of synthetic cells. Gibson is best known for developing Gibson Assembly, an isothermal DNA assembly method widely used in molecular and synthetic biology laboratories.

== Early life and education ==
Gibson grew up in West Seneca, New York, a suburb of Buffalo, New York. After graduating from West Seneca East Senior High School, he attended the University at Buffalo where he earned a Bachelor of Science in Biological Sciences and became a Howard Hughes Medical Institute Scholar. Gibson continued his education at the University of Southern California, where he earned a Ph.D. in molecular biology. His doctoral research centered on DNA replication and cell-cycle regulation using Saccharomyces cerevisiae as a model organism.

== First synthetic genome ==
Gibson did his postdoctoral research with Hamilton O. Smith at the J. Craig Venter Institute (JCVI) before later being appointed to the faculty, where he focused his research on the development of methods to enzymatically create large DNA molecules. The work resulted in the construction of the first synthetic genome, a 582,970-base pair Mycoplasma genitalium genome, which was, at the time, the largest synthetic DNA molecule synthesized. The work gained international attention as a step toward creating the first synthetic cell.

== DNA assembly method development ==
Gibson developed an isothermal in vitro recombination method that stitches together overlapping DNA fragments in a single step, bypassing traditional approaches that used restriction enzymes. The method utilizes an exonuclease to create single-stranded DNA overhangs that anneal to adjacent molecules, a DNA polymerase to fill in the gaps, and a DNA ligase to covalently join the molecules. Following its publication, the research community adopted the name Gibson Assembly which is now widely used in laboratories around the world for cloning DNA.

Gibson demonstrated that the Gibson Assembly method could be used to build DNA fragments starting from overlapping oligonucleotides. He used this approach to synthesize the first mitochondrial genome, which was the 16.3-kilobase pair mouse mitochondrial genome, extending the synthetic biology tools to organellar DNA.

In addition to the development of in vitro recombination methods, Gibson contributed to method development using endogenous homologous recombination in yeast to assemble multiple overlapping DNA fragments from single-stranded oligonucleotides or double-stranded DNA up to complete bacterial and viral genomes. He also contributed to creating bacterial strains from genomes that have been cloned and engineered in yeast.

== Creating synthetic cells ==
Gibson led the genome construction efforts to create a bacterial cell controlled by a chemically synthesized genome. Named JCVI-syn1.0, it has a 1.08-megabase pair Mycoplasma mycoides genome that was, at the time, the largest synthetic DNA construct synthesized. The work was publicized as the creation of the first synthetic cell, gaining international attention including recognition from U.S. President Barack Obama and Pope Benedict XVI. Gibson contributed to and appeared in the Science Channel documentary Creating Synthetic Life, which chronicled the years of scientific work leading up to the synthetic cell milestone.

Gibson contributed to the design and synthesis of JCVI-syn3.0, a synthetic cell with a minimal genome containing 473 genes, which is the smallest set of genes known to sustain independent cellular life. The minimal cell was seen as a step toward programming synthetic cells for various biotechnology applications.

== Synthetic vaccines and distributed manufacturing ==
Gibson contributed to synthetic DNA workflows that enabled the reconstruction of infectious influenza viruses for the purpose of generating vaccines. The new methods reduced the dependency on receiving physical viral samples from infectious patients because vaccine synthesis could begin directly from a digitally transmitted DNA sequence.

Extending on this work, Gibson led the development of a Digital-to-Biological Converter (DBC), an automation platform capable of creating synthetic DNA, RNA, proteins, and viral particles starting from a digitally transmitted DNA sequence without human intervention. The device was described as a prototype "biological teleporter" in press coverage. It was also the subject of Gibson's TED talk in 2018.

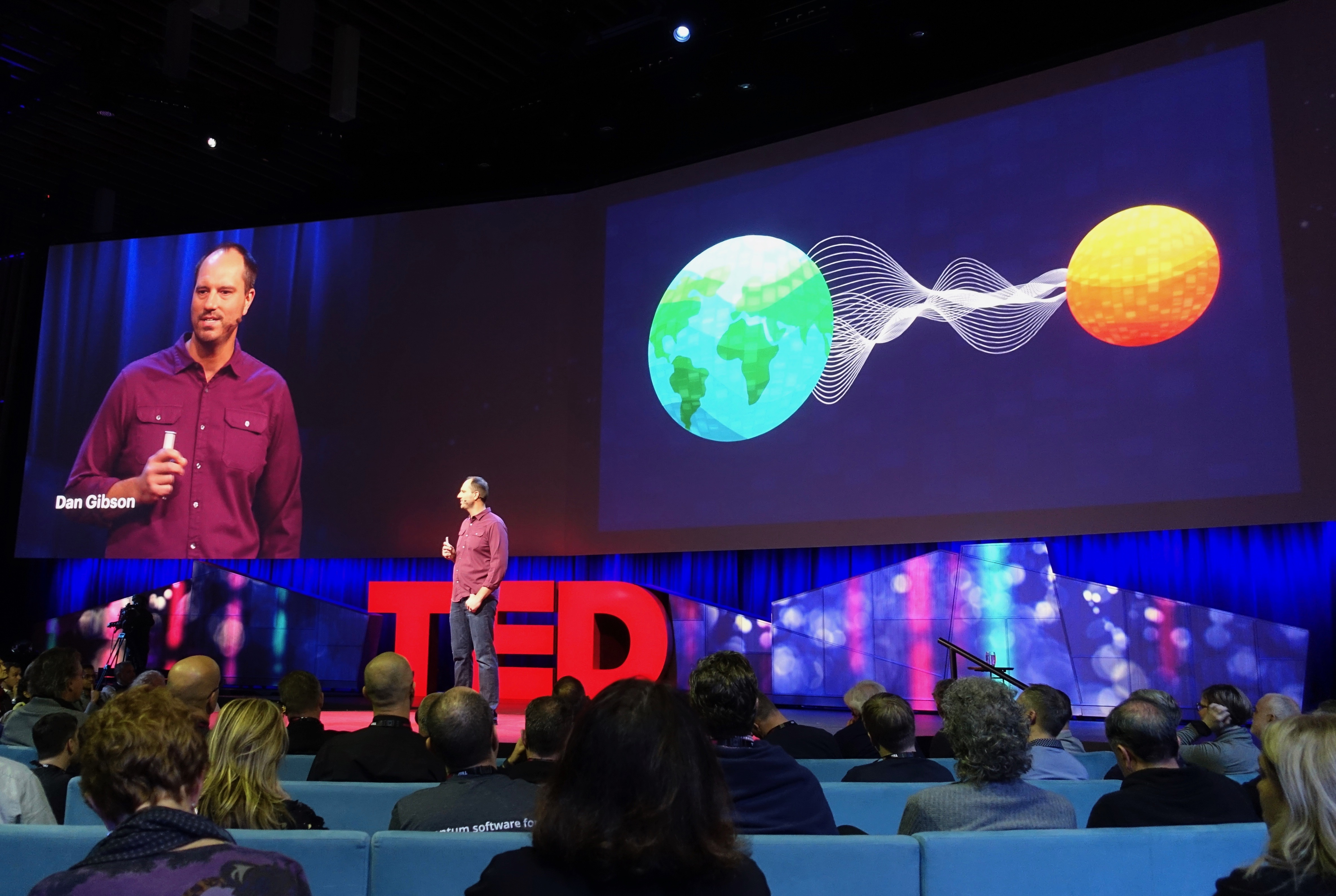
Daniel G. Gibson giving his TED Talk in 2018

== Alternative host organism ==
Gibson helped establish genetic engineering tools for Vibrio natriegens, a fast-growing marine bacterium, to accelerate molecular biology workflows such as cloning and protein expression.

== Commercialization ==
While continuing to serve as a faculty member at the J. Craig Venter Institute, Gibson assumed several additional roles in the biotechnology industry. He served in leadership roles at Synthetic Genomics (SGI) and co-founded its SGI-DNA technology division, which has since been rebranded as Telesis Bio. The products that have been developed throughout the course of Gibson's career are commercialized through Telesis Bio and include the BioXp system, the Gibson SOLA platform, and commercial Gibson Assembly reagent kits.

== Awards and honors ==
Gibson has received several awards and honors. In 2011, he and his colleague J. Craig Venter were recognized in Time magazine's TIME 100 reader poll. In 2012, he received the George W. Thorn Award from the University at Buffalo Alumni Association in recognition of outstanding contributions to his field. He was awarded the SynBioBeta Foundational Technology Award in 2016 for the development of Gibson Assembly, and in 2021 was named to Newsweek magazine's list of "America's Greatest Disruptors: Mind Blowers" for contributions to synthetic biology.
