= Synthetic genomes =

Synthetic genome is a synthetically built genome whose formation involves either genetic modification on pre-existing life forms or artificial gene synthesis to create new DNA or entire lifeforms. The field that studies synthetic genomes is called synthetic genomics.

== Recombinant DNA technology ==
Soon after the discovery of restriction endonucleases and ligases, the field of genetics began using these molecular tools to assemble artificial sequences from smaller fragments of synthetic or naturally occurring DNA. The advantage in using the recombinatory approach as opposed to continual DNA synthesis stems from the inverse relationship that exists between synthetic DNA length and percent purity of that synthetic length. In other words, as you synthesize longer sequences, the number of error-containing clones increases due to the inherent error rates of current technologies. Although recombinant DNA technology is more commonly used in the construction of fusion proteins and plasmids, several techniques with larger capacities have emerged, allowing for the construction of entire genomes.

=== Polymerase cycling assembly ===
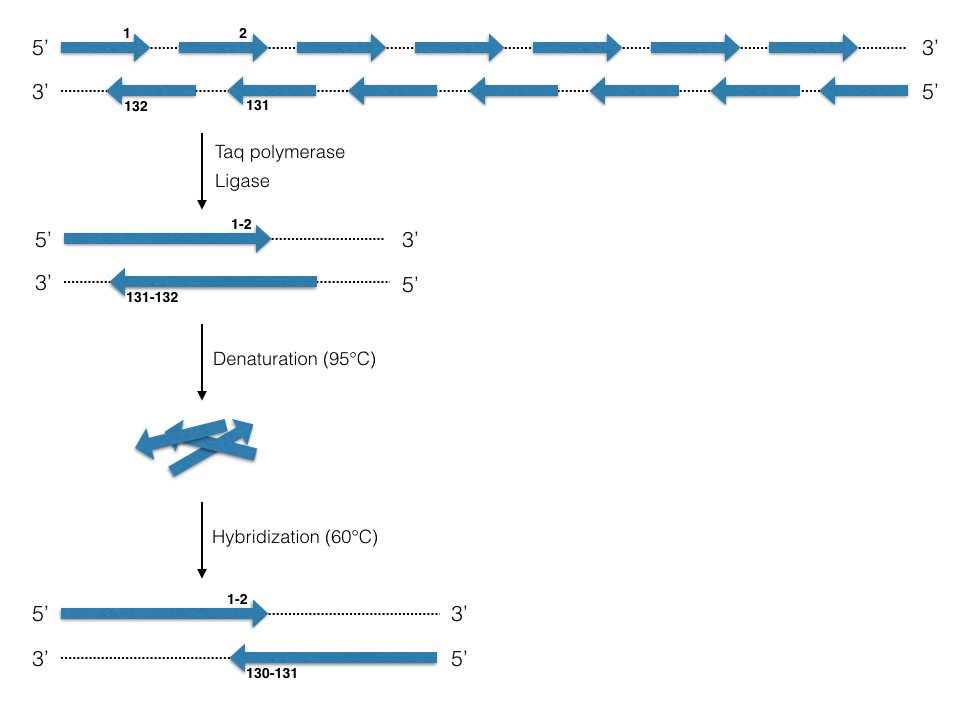
Polymerase Cycling Assembly. Blue arrows represent oligonucleotides 40 to 60 bp with overlapping regions of about 20 bp. The cycle is repeated until the final genome is constructed.

Polymerase cycling assembly (PCA) uses a series of oligonucleotides (or oligos), approximately 40 to 60 nucleotides long, that altogether constitute both strands of the DNA being synthesized. These oligos are designed such that a single oligo from one strand contains a length of approximately 20 nucleotides at each end that is complementary to sequences of two different oligos on the opposite strand, thereby creating regions of overlap. The entire set is processed through cycles of: (a) hybridization at 60 °C; (b) elongation via Taq polymerase and a standard ligase; and (c) denaturation at 95 °C, forming progressively longer contiguous strands and ultimately resulting in the final genome. PCA was used to generate the first synthetic genome in history, that of the Phi X 174 virus.

=== Gibson assembly method ===
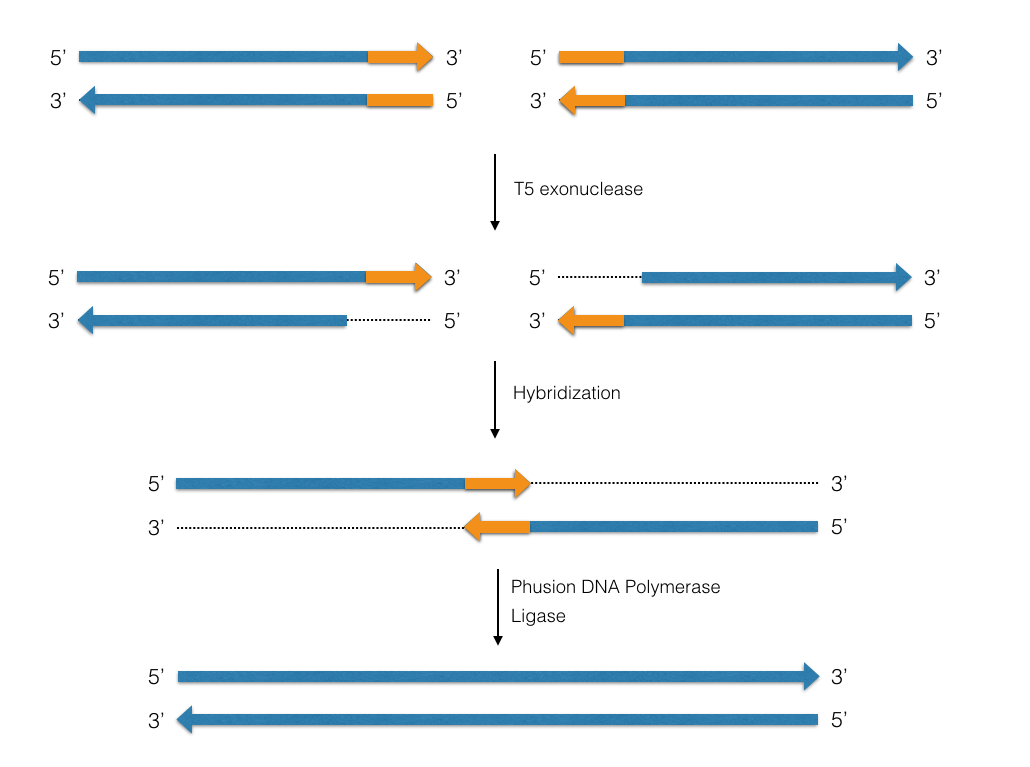
Gibson Assembly Method. The blue arrows represent DNA cassettes, which could be any size, 6 kb each for example. The orange segments represent areas of identical DNA sequences. This process can be carried out with multiple initial cassettes.

The gibson assembly method, designed by Daniel Gibson during his time at the J. Craig Venter Institute, requires a set of double-stranded DNA cassettes that constitute the entire genome being synthesized. Note that cassettes differ from contigs by definition, in that these sequences contain regions of homology to other cassettes for the purposes of recombination. In contrast to Polymerase Cycling Assembly, Gibson Assembly is a single-step, isothermal reaction with larger sequence-length capacity; ergo, it is used in place of Polymerase Cycling Assembly for genomes larger than 6 kb.

A T5 exonuclease performs a chew-back reaction at the terminal segments, working in the 5' to 3' direction, thereby producing complementary overhangs. The overhangs hybridize to each other, a Phusion DNA polymerase fills in any missing nucleotides and the nicks are sealed with a ligase. However, the genomes capable of being synthesized using this method alone is limited because as DNA cassettes increase in length, they require propagation in vitro in order to continue hybridizing; accordingly, Gibson assembly is often used in conjunction with Transformation-Associated Recombination (see below) to synthesize genomes several hundred kilobases in size.

=== Transformation-associated recombination ===
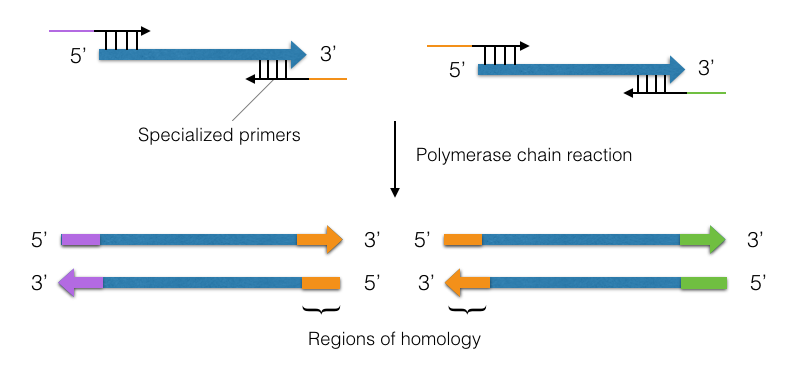
Gap Repair Cloning. The blue arrows represent DNA contigs. Segments of the same colour represent complementary or identical sequences. Specialized primers with extensions are used in a polymerase chain reaction to generate regions of homology at the terminal ends of the DNA contigs.

The goal of transformation-associated recombination (TAR) technology in synthetic genomics is to combine DNA contigs by means of homologous recombination performed by the Yeast Artificial Chromosome (YAC). Of importance is the CEN element within the YAC vector, which corresponds to the yeast centromere. This sequence gives the vector the ability to behave in a chromosomal manner, thereby allowing it to perform homologous recombination.

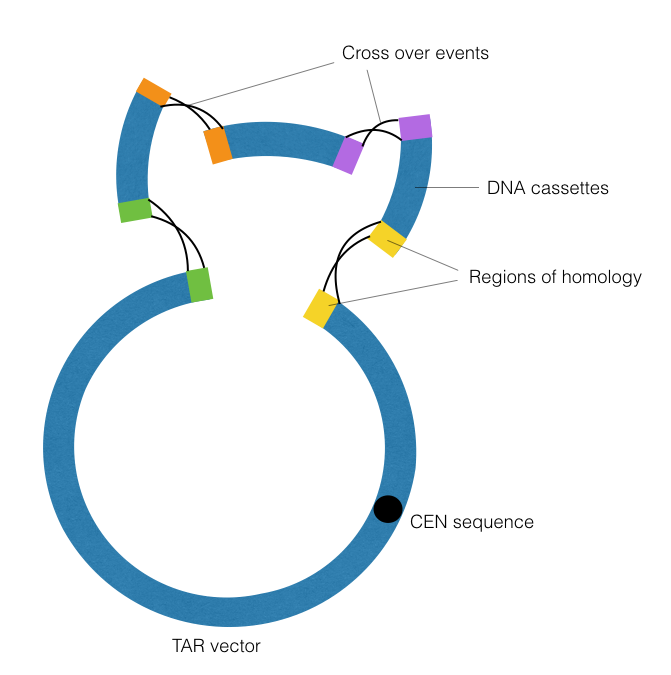
Transformation-Associated Recombination. Cross over events occur between regions of homology across the cassettes and YAC vector, thereby connecting the smaller DNA sequences into one larger contig.

First, gap repair cloning is performed to generate regions of homology flanking the DNA contigs. Gap Repair Cloning is a particular form of the Polymerase Chain Reaction in which specialized primers with extensions beyond the sequence of the DNA target are utilized. Then, the DNA cassettes are exposed to the YAC vector, which drives the process of homologous recombination, thereby connecting the DNA cassettes. Polymerase Cycling Assembly and TAR technology were used together to construct the 600 kb Mycoplasma genitalium genome in 2008, the first synthetic organism ever created. Similar steps were taken in synthesizing the larger Mycoplasma mycoides genome a few years later.

=== General creation of synthetic genomes ===
It is difficult to directly synthesize oligonucleotides larger than ~200 base pairs and maintain high fidelity. Therefore, smaller oligonucleotides (around 5-20 base pairs) are combined to create genome-size oligonucleotides. Previous methods of stitching the smaller strands involved using T4 polynucleotide ligase. Modern techniques, like PCA/PCR based-methods have improved on this method, increasing speed and fidelity. To further increase fidelity, PCA-based methods can include an error-reversal step in which nucleases recognize and cut mismatched base pairs. Recognition is possible because errors usually cause structural budges and abnormalities in the DNA. Currently, a 4-Mb E. coli genome created in May 2019 holds the record for the largest synthetic genome size.

== See also ==
- Synthetic genomics
