= Budiša =

Budiša is a Croatian surname. Notable people with the surname include:

- Igor Budiša (born 1977), Croatian footballer
- Dražen Budiša (born 1948), Croatian politician
- Nediljko Budisa (born 1966), Croatian scientist
