= Alloprotein =

An alloprotein is a novel synthetic protein containing one or more "non-natural" amino acids. Non-natural in the context means an amino acid either not occurring in nature (novel and synthesised amino acids), or occurring in nature but not naturally occurring within proteins (natural but non-proteinogenic amino acids).

The possibility for novel amino acids and proteins arises because, in nature, the genetic code responsible for protein structure has 64 possible codons available for encoding all amino acids used in proteins (4 nucleotides in each of 3 bases; 4 x 4 x 4 gives 64 possible combinations); however, in human beings and other eukaryotes, these encode for just 20 standard amino acids. This level of information redundancy within the codon table is known in biochemistry as degeneracy. It opens the door for new amino acids to be potentially encoded.

One approach takes advantage of the redundancy of the 3 codons that encode a "stop" signal. If one of these can be substituted by another stop codon, then that codon can in principle be "reassigned" (along with requisite tRNA, release factor and enzyme modifications) to code for a novel amino acid without affecting other existing codings. Using this approach, alloproteins and novel amino acids can be created by techniques that "expand" the genetic code to include additional novel codings, using newly devised codons and related tRNA (transfer RNA) and tRNA synthetase enzymes (aminoacyl tRNA synthetase). The usual mechanisms, which produce amino acids and combine them into proteins, then produce novel or non-proteinogenic amino acids and incorporate them to make novel proteins the same way. In 2010 this technique was used to reassign a codon in the genetic code of the bacterium E. coli, modifying it to produce and incorporate a novel amino acid, without adversely affecting existing encodings or the organism itself.

Alloprotein uses include the incorporation of unusual or heavy atoms for diffractive structure analysis, photo-reactive linkers (photocrosslinkers), fluorescent groups (used as labelled probes), and molecular switches for signaling pathways.

== Definition and history ==
Modern alloprotein techniques were first developed in the late 1980s by Miyazawa and Yokoyama at the University of Tokyo to address limitations of existing methods: genetic manipulation was limited to the 20 standard amino acids, chemical synthesis was limited to small scale and low yield.

An early use of the term is found in a 1990 paper "Biosynthesis of alloprotein", by Koide, Yokoyama and Miyazawa.

A working description is provided by Budisa et al:

"Genetic code engineering is [a] new research field that intent to reprogram protein synthesis by reassignment of specific codons to non-canonical (mainly synthetic) amino acids. The resulting proteins are alloproteins with tailor-made properties that are of outstanding interest for both, academia and industrial biotechnology."
