= Artificial chromosome =

Artificial chromosome may refer to:

- Yeast artificial chromosome
- Bacterial artificial chromosome
- Human artificial chromosome
- P1-derived artificial chromosome
- Synthetic DNA of a base pair size comparable to a chromosome
