= Nediljko Budisa =

Croatian chemist

Nediljko "Ned" Budisa
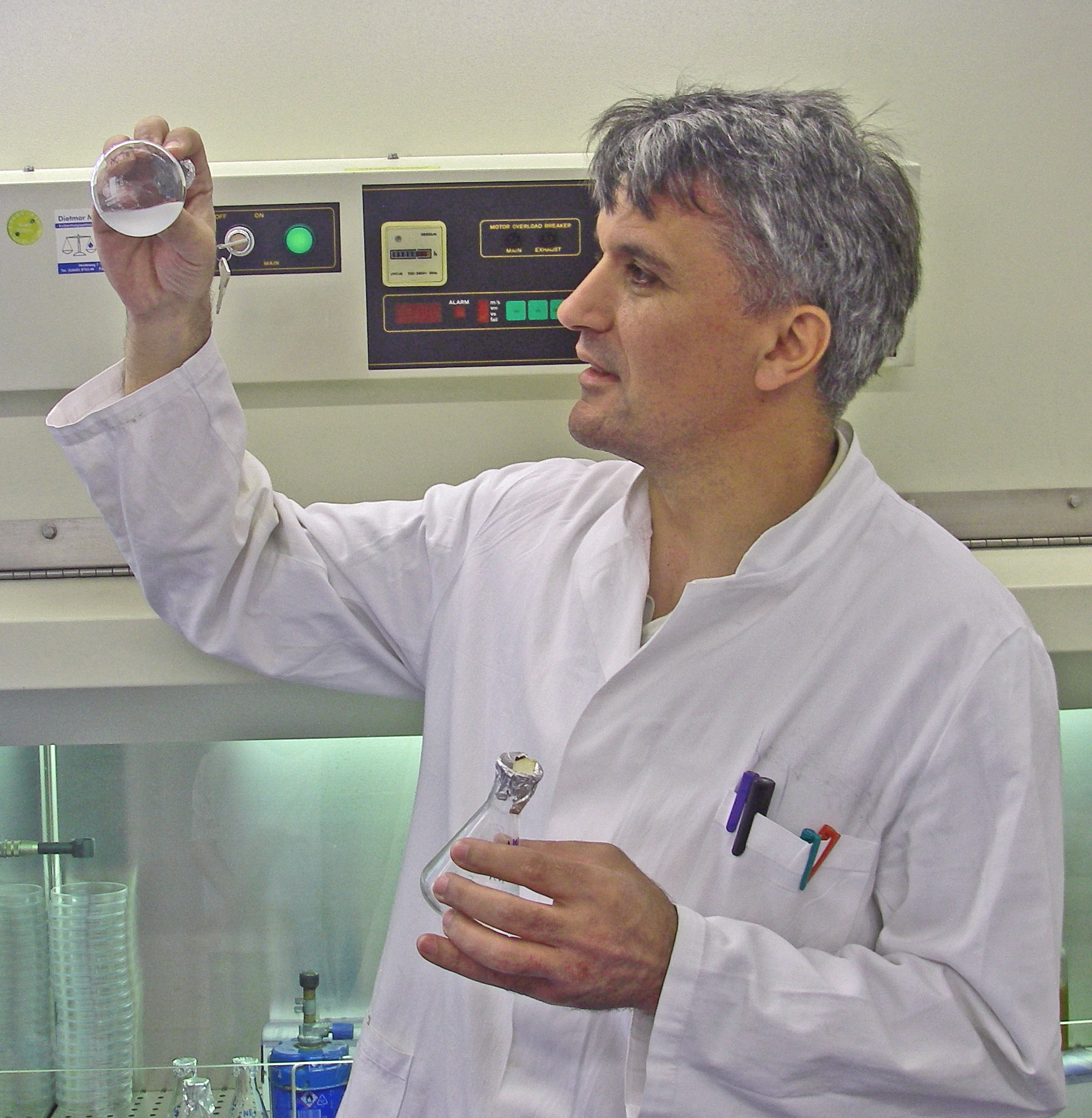
- Ned in a TU Berlin Laboratory in 2012
- Born: 21 November 1966 (age 59); Šibenik, SR Croatia, SFR Yugoslavia
- Education: Faculty of Science, University of Zagreb
- Scientific career
- Fields: Biochemistry, bioorganic chemistry, molecular genetics synthetic biology
- Workplaces: University of Manitoba

Nediljko "Ned" Budisa (Croatian: Nediljko Budiša; born 21 November 1966) is a Croatian biochemist, professor and holder of the Tier 1 Canada Research Chair (CRC) for chemical synthetic biology at the University of Manitoba. He contributed to the fields of genetic code engineering, chemical synthetic biology and Xenobiology. Of interdisciplinary nature, his scientific contributions relate to bioorganic, medical chemistry, structural biology, and biophysics. He is the author of a textbook in his research field: "Engineering the genetic code: expanding the amino acid repertoire for the design of novel proteins".

== Early life, education and career ==
Ned Budisa earned a high school teacher diploma in Chemistry and Biology in 1990, a B.S. in Molecular Biology and MSc in Biophysics in 1993 from the University of Zagreb. He received a PhD in 1997 from the Technical University of Munich where his thesis advisor was Professor Robert Huber. He also habilitated at the Technical University of Munich in 2005 and worked afterwards as a junior group leader ("Molecular Biotechnology") at the Max Planck Institute for Biochemistry in Munich. Between 2007 and 2010 he was a member of CIPS^{M} in Munich. He was appointed as full professor of biocatalysis at the TU Berlin in 2010 until the end of 2018, when he accepted the Tier 1 CRC position in Chemical Synthetic Biology at the University of Manitoba. He remained affiliated with TU Berlin through an adjunct professorship (2018–2023) and was also a member of the Excellence Cluster 'Unifying Systems in Catalysis' (UniSysCat). In 2014, he founded the first Berlin iGEM team. In 2022, he founded the first iGEM team at the University of Manitoba.

== Research ==
Ned Budisa works in genetic code engineering and chemical synthetic biology, developing in vivo techniques to introduce genetically encoded modifications into proteins and entire proteomes. He applies the Selective Pressure Incorporation (SPI) method that enables single and multiple in vivo incorporations of synthetic (i.e. non-canonical) amino acid analogs in proteins, preferably by sense codon reassignment. His methodology allows for fine chemical manipulations of a few amino acid side chains, mainly of proline, tryptophan and methionine. These experiments are often assisted with metabolic engineering techniques in collaboration with Prof. Sven Panke. Ned's research goal is the transfer of various physicochemical properties and bioorthogonal chemistry reactions (chemoselective ligations such as click chemistry) as well as special spectroscopic features (e.g. blue and golden fluorescence, local electric fields or vibration energy transfer) into the proteins of living cells. In addition, his method allows the delivery of element-specific properties (fluorine, selenium and tellurium) into the biochemistry of life. He also pioneered computer-aided design libraries for directed evolution, creating novel enzymes that rival their natural counterparts and enabling the efficient engineering of synthetic proteins. By merging genetic code expansion and metabolic engineering with genome editing, he created artificial microbes based on the intestinal bacterium Escherichia coli with an intrinsic 'genetic firewall' that, unlike genetically modified organisms, enables the safe production of proteins and other metabolites in genetic isolation within a single fermentation process that does not require the use of expensive and often harmful antibiotics.

Ned Budisa is well known for the establishment of the use of selenium-containing non-canonical amino acids for protein X-ray crystallography and fluorine-containing analogs for 19F NMR-spectroscopy and protein folding studies. He was the first to demonstrate the use of genetic code engineering as a tool for the creation of therapeutic proteins and ribosomally synthesized peptide-drugs. He has succeeded with innovative engineering of biomaterials, in particular photoactivatable mussel-based underwater adhesives. Ned Budisa made seminal contributions to our understanding of the role of methionine oxidation in prion protein aggregation and has discovered the roles of proline side chain conformations (endo-exo isomerism) in translation, folding and stability of proteins.

Together with his co-worker Vladimir Kubyshkin, the new-to-nature hydrophobic polyproline-II helix foldamer was designed. Along with Budisa's previous work on bioexpression using proline analogues, the results of this project contributed to the establishment of the Alanine World hypothesis. It explains why nature chose the genetic code with "only" 20 canonical amino acids for ribosomal protein synthesis.

In 2015, the team led by Ned Budisa reported the successful completion of a long-term evolution experiment that resulted in full, proteome-wide substitution of all 20,899 tryptophan residues with thienopyrrole-alanine in the genetic code of the bacterium Escherichia coli. This is a solid basis for the evolution of life with alternative building blocks, foldamers or biochemistries. At the same time, this approach might be an interesting biosafety technology to evolve biocontained synthetic cells equipped with a "genetic firewall" which prevents their survival outside of man-made unnatural environments. Similar experiments with fluorinated tryptophan analogs as xenobiotic compounds (in collaboration with Beate Koksch from the Free University of Berlin) has led to the discovery of exceptional physiological plasticity in microbial cultures during adaptive laboratory evolution, making them potential environmentally friendly tools for new bioremediation strategies.

Ned Budisa is also actively involved in the debate of possible societal, ethical and philosophical impacts of radical genetic code engineering in the context of synthetic cells and life as well as technologies derived thereof.

== Awards and honors (selection) ==
- 2004: BioFuture Award
- 2017: Publication Award Fluorine Chemistry

== See also ==
- Bioconjugation
- Biocontainment
- Bioorthogonal chemistry
- Biosafety
- Biosecurity
- Biosignature
- Central dogma of molecular biology
- Directed evolution
- Expanded genetic code
- Genetic code
- Synthetic life
- Xenobiology
