= Codon reassignment =

Codon reassignment is the biological process via which the way the genetic code of a cell is read is changed as a response to the environment. Typically codons, sets of three mRNA nucleotides, correspond to one specific amino acid. Codon reassignment is the exception to this rule. When a codon is reassigned, it codes for a new amino acid. This change in code can have immense consequences for the cell as protein structures are altered.

== Mechanics of Codon Reassignment ==
=== Normal Codon Behavior ===
When read from the center out, this chart shows which amino acid a sequence of three nucleotides would normally code for. When codon reassignment occurs, the sequence of three nucleotides may code for a different amino acid.

Proteins are essential to life, performing many necessary cellular functions. Cells construct proteins with amino acids using DNA instructions. Typically, DNA is transcribed into messenger RNA (mRNA) and the mRNA is translated into a sequence of amino acids. The complex that facilitates translation from mRNA to amino acid is called the ribosome. Ribosomes hold and read mRNA in three nucleotide chunks called codons. Codons have a corresponding transport RNA (tRNA) that binds to the ribosome. tRNAs are responsible for bringing amino acids to the ribosome so they can be incorporated into the protein. Though each codon only codes for a single tRNA, a tRNA can represent multiple codons. This is because there are 64 possible codon combinations and 20 natural amino acids. Each tRNA codes for a single amino acid. Each amino acid is added to the growing chain of amino acids that will form the final protein. The initial chain of amino acids, also called the primary structure of the protein, determines the final shape and functional capacity of the protein.

=== Reassigned Codon Behavior ===
When codon reassignment occurs, it is usually due to a change in tRNAs. A tRNA can be assigned to a new codon or the tRNA can be altered to pick up a different amino acid. For the protein, this means either swapping one amino acid for another, or in the case of a stop codon, adding an amino acid where there was none before. Since the primary structure determines the functionality of a protein, changing even one amino acid in this way can drastically impact what the final protein is able to do.

== Examples of Codon Reassignment ==
=== Amino acid deficiencies ===
In bacteria and yeast, codon reassignment can be caused by a shortage of required amino acids. Instead of halting protein production all together, tRNA molecules select another amino acid to add to the amino acid chain. This amino acid may have similar properties to the intended amino acid, or it may not. This may cause deformities in the proteins, making them less efficient or even nonfunctional. A hypothesis as to why this phenomenon persists despite the loss of efficiency is that it is preferable for the organism to have a worse version of the protein than to have no protein at all.

In some human cancer cells, such as melanoma cells, a similar tactic is used. As an immune response, to try and destroy the cancer, T cells release an enzyme that destroys the essential amino acid tryptophan within the cancer cells. This typically deprives the cancer of many key proteins, killing the cancer cells. However, some cancer cells are able to use codon reassignment to replace the tryptophan with a similar amino acid called phenylalanine. This amino acid replacement and resulting functional protein allows the cancer cell to survive and continue dividing.

=== Alteration of tRNAs ===
In some bacteriophages, tRNAs have been assigned to stop codons TAG and TGA to code for amino acids glutamine and tryptophan respectively. The reasons for this codon reassignment are still being studied, it may be related to the infection process.

Exposure to outside environmental factors can alter tRNA molecules enough to result in codon reassignment. For example, after being infected with a certain virus, rat liver cells can replace the amino acid selenocysteine with cysteine, a structurally similar amino acid.

== Implications of Codon Reassignment ==
=== Not-So Universal Genetic Code ===
It has been well documented that there are variations in genetic code within between nucleic DNA, mitochondrial DNA and chloroplast DNA. However, it was previously thought that the genetic code was consistent across species within the nucleus. The existence of codon reassignment challenges this idea. The same codon may code for different amino acids in different species. Codon reassignment shows flexibility and adaptability within genetic code.

=== Potential Uses of Codon Reassignment ===
Artificial, synthetic, unnatural, or non-proteinogenic amino acids are used in research to help understand the construction and functionality of proteins. These artificial amino acids are also used in some medications. Researchers normally use stop codons, which do not code for an amino acid, to insert these amino acids into proteins. Since there are only three stop codons, researchers were previously limited to using only one or two artificial amino acids. There was also an option to use artificial tRNA molecules to insert artificial amino acids, but these artificial tRNA molecules are not as high quality as natural tRNA molecules, often making mistakes. The ability to reassign natural tRNA to artificial amino acids through codon reassignment unlocks many possibilities for this research. Since there are 64 possible combinations and only about 20 natural amino acids, this method would allow researchers to hypothetically insert 43 artificial amino acids into a protein, preserving one stop codon to complete the translation process properly. These advancements in genetic and protein manipulation may help scientists and doctors to deepen humanity's understanding of cellular functions and produce more effective and efficient medicines.

== See also ==
- Expanded genetic code
- Transcription (biology)
- Translation (biology)
- Gene expression
- Cancer genome sequencing
