= Floyd E. Romesberg =

American geneticist

- Known for: DNA; Human genome Metagenomics; Synthetic genomics
- Scientific career
- Fields: Biochemist, Geneticist
- Workplaces: Scripps Research
- Website: Romesberg Lab

Floyd E. Romesberg is an American biotechnologist, biochemist, and geneticist formerly at Scripps Research in San Diego, California. He is known for leading the team that created the first Unnatural Base Pair (UBP), thus expanding the genetic alphabet of four letters to six in 2012, the first semi-synthetic organism in 2014, and the first functional semi-synthetic organism that can reproduce its genetic material in successive offspring, in 2017.

== Awards and nominations ==
- 2015: Nobel Laureate Signature Award
- 2018: Royal Society of Chemistry (RSC) Bioorganic Chemistry Award
