= Protein expression =

Protein expression may refer to:

- Gene expression, the processes that convert the information of DNA genes into a functional copies of mRNA in living cells
- Protein production, the method of generating some quantity of a specific protein in biotechnology
