= D5SICS =

d5SICS
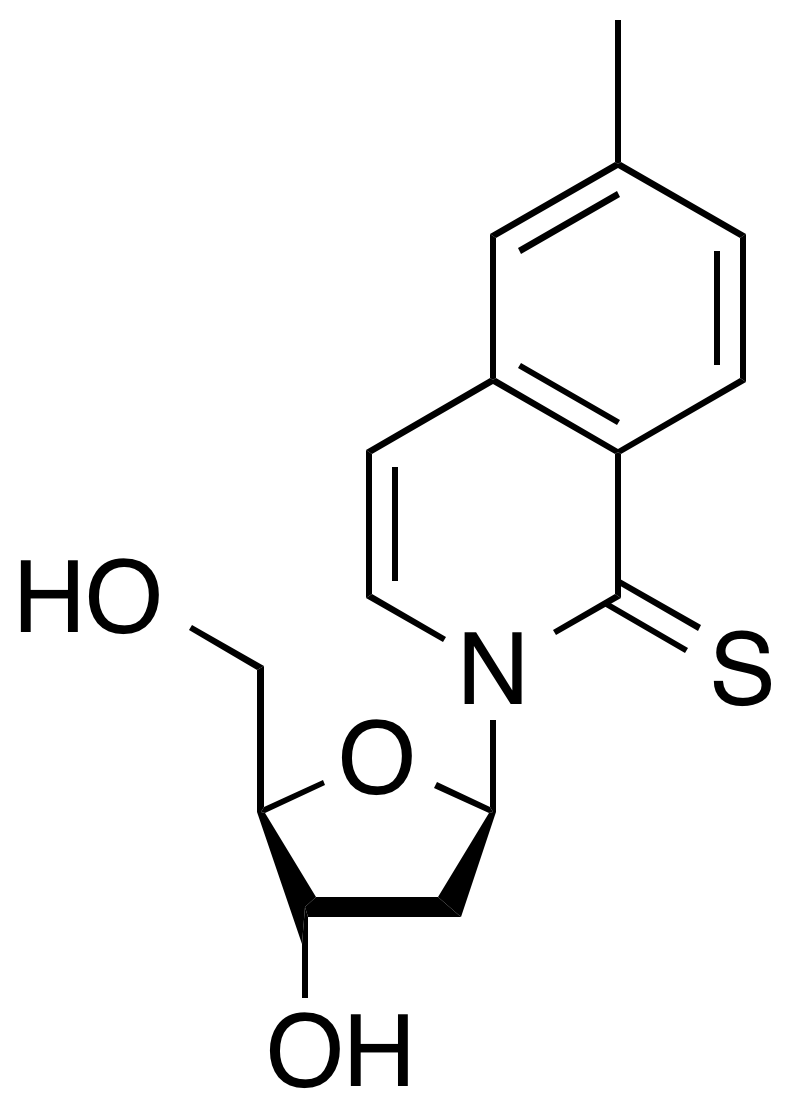
- Haworth projection of d5SICS

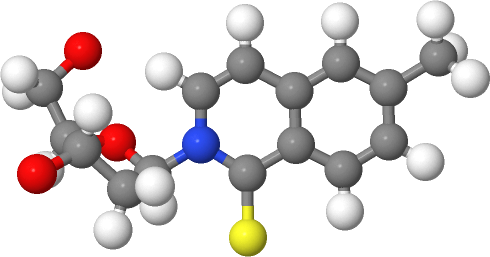
- Ball-and-stick model of d5SICS

Names
- IUPAC name 2-(2-Deoxy-β-D-erythro-pentofuranosyl)-6-methylisoquinoline-1(2H)-thione
- Systematic IUPAC name 2-[(2R,4S,5R)-4-Hydroxy-5-(hydroxymethyl)oxolan-2-yl]-6-methylisoquinoline-1(2H)-thione

Identifiers
CAS Number	1010689-00-5
3D model (JSmol)	Interactive image; Interactive image
ChemSpider	58191598
PubChem CID	102129314
CompTox Dashboard (EPA)	DTXSID701032714
- InChI: InChI=1S/C15H17NO3S/c1-9-2-3-11-10(6-9)4-5-16(15(11)20)14-7-12(18)13(8-17)19-14/h2-6,12-14,17-18H,7-8H2,1H3/t12-,13+,14+/m0/s1 Key: ISOKBQJGUJTDAE-BFHYXJOUSA-N
- SMILES: OCC3OC(N2C=Cc1cc(ccc1C2=S)C)CC3(O); Cc1ccc2c(c1)ccn(c2=S)[C@H]3C[C@@H]([C@H](O3)CO)O

Properties
Chemical formula	C_{15}H_{17}NO_{3}S
Molar mass	291.37 g/mol
- Except where otherwise noted, data are given for materials in their standard state (at 25 °C [77 °F], 100 kPa). Infobox references

d5SICS is an artificial nucleoside containing 6-methylisoquinoline-1-thione-2-yl group instead of a base.

It pairs up with dNaM in a hydrophobic interaction. It was not able to be removed by the error-correcting machinery of the E. coli into which it was inserted. The pairing of d5SICS–dNaM is mediated by packing and hydrophobic forces instead of hydrogen bonding, which occurs in natural base pairs. Therefore, in free DNA, rings of d5SICS and dNaM are placed in parallel planes instead of the same plane. The d5SICS-dNaM pairing replaced an older dNaM-dTPT3 pairing.
