= DNaM =

dNaM
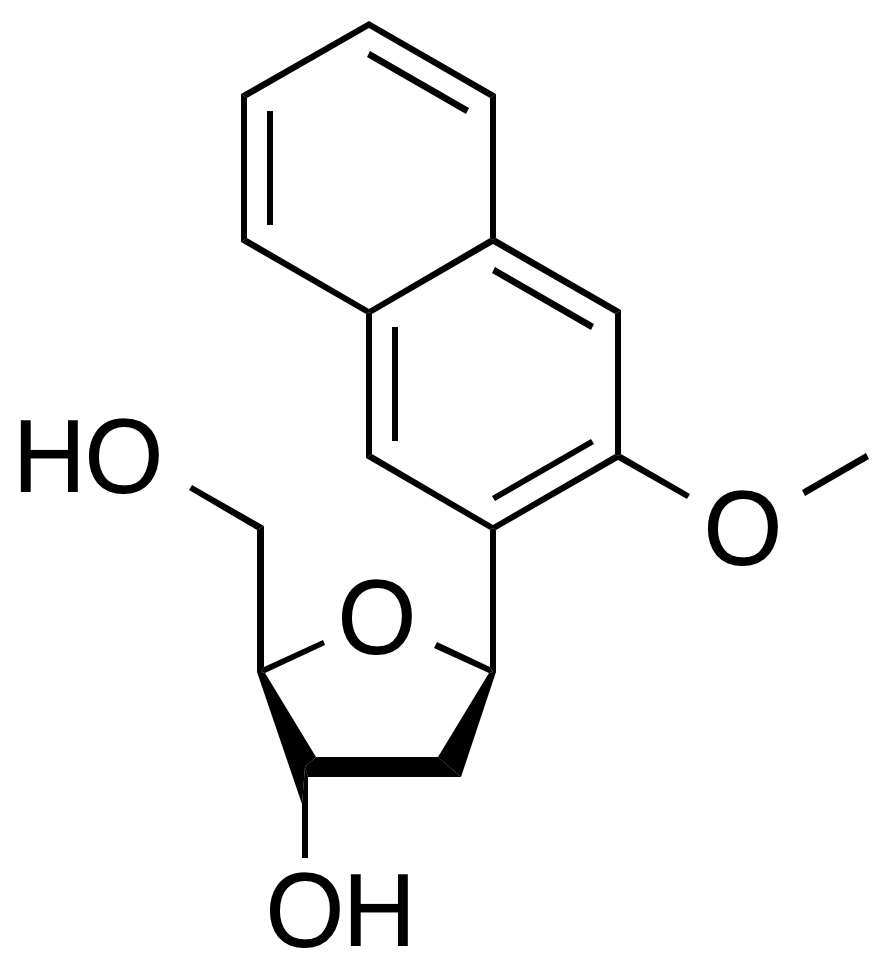
- 2D structure of dNaM

Names
- IUPAC name (1R)-1,4-Anhydro-2-deoxy-1-(3-methoxynaphthalen-2-yl)-D-erythro-pentitol
- Systematic IUPAC name (2R,3S,5R)-2-(Hydroxymethyl)-5-(3-methoxynaphthalen-2-yl)oxolan-3-ol

Identifiers
CAS Number	1117893-19-2
3D model (JSmol)	Interactive image
ChemSpider	58191600
PubChem CID	102129315
CompTox Dashboard (EPA)	DTXSID501046397
- InChI: InChI=1S/C16H18O4/c1-19-14-7-11-5-3-2-4-10(11)6-12(14)15-8-13(18)16(9-17)20-15/h2-7,13,15-18H,8-9H2,1H3/t13-,15+,16+/m0/s1 Key: XVSHFDVHYNHNDU-NUEKZKHPSA-N
- SMILES: COc1cc2ccccc2cc1[C@H]3C[C@@H]([C@H](O3)CO)O
- Except where otherwise noted, data are given for materials in their standard state (at 25 °C [77 °F], 100 kPa). Infobox references

dNaM is an artificial nucleobase containing a 3-methoxy-2-naphthyl group instead of a natural base.

When it was originally successfully introduced into DNA for replication in an E. coli semi-synthetic organism, it was paired up with d5SICS. For short it is called X whilst the d5SICS being called Y. d5SICS was replaced by dTPT3 in revised versions due to its improved ability to replicate in a wider range of sequence contexts. X pairs with Y using hydrophobic and packing interactions instead of hydrogen bonding, which occurs in natural base pairs. Inside the semi-synthetic organism, methyl directed mismatch repair pathway (MMR) actually fixes unnatural-natural mispairs, whereas recombinational repair actually cuts out the unnatural. The E. coli semi-synthetic organism managed to hold onto the new base for an extended time both while on a plasmid as well as when stored in the chromosome. In free DNA, rings of d5SICS and dNaM are placed in parallel planes instead of the same plane, but when inside of a DNA polymerase, they pair using an edge-to-edge conformation. dNaM and dTPT3 can also template transcription of mRNAs and tRNAs by T7 RNA polymerase that have the ability to produce decode at the E. coli ribosome to produce proteins with unnatural amino acids, expanding the genetic code.
