= Norcholestane =

Norcholestane, also known by the molecular formula C_{26}H_{46}, may refer to:may refer to:

- 19-Norcholestane
- 21-Norcholestane
- 24-Norcholestane
- 27-Norcholestane
