= Leucines =

The leucines are primarily the four isomeric amino acids: leucine, isoleucine, tert-leucine (terleucine, pseudoleucine) and norleucine. Being compared with the four butanols, they could be classified as butyl-substituted glycines; they represent all four possible variations.

Leucine and isoleucine belong to the proteinogenic amino acids; the others are non-natural.

== Isomers ==
Including the stereoisomers, six further isomers could be added: D-leucine, D-isoleucine, L-alloisoleucine, D-alloisoleucine, D-tert-leucine and D-norleucine.

Leucines
Name	L-Leucine	L-Isoleucine	L-tert-Leucine (terleucine, pseudoleucine)	L-Norleucine
Other names	2-Amino-4-methylpentanoic acid, Isobutylglycine	2-Amino-3-methylpentanoic acid, sec-Butylglycine	2-Amino-3,3-dimethylbutanoic acid, tert-Butylglycine	2-Amino-hexanoic acid, n-Butylglycine
Structure				
CAS-number	61-90-5	73-32-5	20859-02-3	327-57-1
PubChem	CID 6106 from PubChem	CID 791 from PubChem	CID 164608 from PubChem	CID 21236 from PubChem
Molecular formula	C_{6}H_{13}NO_{2}			
Molar mass	131.18 g/mol			

== Derivatives ==
Cycloleucine could be classified as a cyclic derivative of norleucine. With a cyclopentane-ring, it has two hydrogen atoms fewer and thus is not an isomer. The α-carbon atom is not a stereocenter.

Cycloleucine

== See also ==
- L-Photo-Leucine

== Literature ==
- Jeremy M. Berg, John L. Tymoczko, Lubert Stryer: Biochemie. 6 Auflage, Spektrum Akademischer Verlag, Heidelberg 2007. ISBN 978-3-8274-1800-5.
- Donald Voet, Judith G. Voet: Biochemistry. 3. Auflage, John Wiley & Sons, New York 2004. ISBN 0-471-19350-X.
- Bruce Alberts, Alexander Johnson, Peter Walter, Julian Lewis, Martin Raff, Keith Roberts: Molecular Biology of the Cell, 5. Auflage, Taylor & Francis 2007, ISBN 978-0815341062.
