= Cycloleucine =

Names
- Preferred IUPAC name 1-aminocyclopentane-1-carboxylic acid

Identifiers
CAS Number	52-52-8
3D model (JSmol)	Interactive image; Interactive image
ChEBI	CHEBI:40547
ChEMBL	ChEMBL295830
ChemSpider	2798
DrugBank	DB04620
ECHA InfoCard	100.000.132
KEGG	C03969
PubChem CID	2901
UNII	0TQU7668EI
CompTox Dashboard (EPA)	DTXSID5024475
- InChI: InChI=1S/C6H11NO2/c7-6(5(8)9)3-1-2-4-6/h1-4,7H2,(H,8,9) Key: NILQLFBWTXNUOE-UHFFFAOYSA-N; InChI=1/C6H11NO2/c7-6(5(8)9)3-1-2-4-6/h1-4,7H2,(H,8,9) Key: NILQLFBWTXNUOE-UHFFFAOYAN
- SMILES: C1CCC(C1)(C(=O)O)N; O=C(O)C1(N)CCCC1

Properties
Chemical formula	C_{6}H_{11}NO_{2}
Molar mass	129.16 g/mol
Appearance	white of beige crystalline flakes or powder
Density	1.207 g/mL
Melting point	320 °C (608 °F; 593 K)
Boiling point	256.1 °C (493.0 °F; 529.2 K)
Solubility in water	50 mg/mL

Hazards
- Occupational safety and health (OHS/OSH)
Main hazards	Irritant
- Except where otherwise noted, data are given for materials in their standard state (at 25 °C [77 °F], 100 kPa). verify (what is ?) Infobox references

Cycloleucine is a non-proteinogenic amino acid. It could be classified as a cyclopentane derivative of norleucine, having two hydrogen atoms less. The α-carbon atom is not a stereocenter. Cycloleucine is a non-metabolisable amino acid that specifically and reversibly inhibits nucleic acid methylation. It is widely used in biochemical experiments.

In 2007, a research study had shown that cycloleucine can lower S-adenosyl methionine (SAM) levels in primary rat hepatocytes by inhibiting the conversion of 5′-methylthioadenosine to SAM through the methionine salvage pathway. Cycloleucine treatment in conjunction with higher levels of cytochrome P450 2E1 (CYP2E1) and lower SAM levels in pyrazole hepatocytes had shown an increased amount of cell apoptosis when compared to control hepatocytes.

In a 2015 study on the role of N6-methyladenosine (m6A) demethylation on adipogenesis, researchers treated porcine adipocytes with increasing concentrations of cycloleucine. The researchers measured mRNA concentration of m6A using the dot blot method, and the results showed that cycloleucine increased adipocyte growth by blocking methylation by inhibiting m6A levels relative to the control adipocytes.

A 2022 study showed that cycloleucine inhibits porcine oocyte and embryo development. Researchers cultured porcine oocytes and isolated cumulus cells from their cumulus cell complexes, after which the cells were cultured in vitro with cycloleucine in increasing concentrations. The samples were monitored under fluorescence microscopy, with the results showing positive relationship between cycloleucine concentration and decreased viability and survival rate for oocytes.
