= Norvaline =

Names
- IUPAC name 2-Aminopentanoic acid
- Other names 2-Aminovaleric acid; α-Aminopentanoic acid; Propylglycine

Identifiers
CAS Number	6600-40-4
3D model (JSmol)	(L): Interactive image; (DL): Interactive image; (D): Interactive image
ChEMBL	ChEMBL55612
ChemSpider	58608 (L); 801 (DL); 388660 (D)
ECHA InfoCard	100.026.858
PubChem CID	65098
UNII	A70UKS48FE
CompTox Dashboard (EPA)	DTXSID701018015
- InChI: (L): InChI=1S/C5H11NO2/c1-2-3-4(6)5(7)8/h4H,2-3,6H2,1H3,(H,7,8)/t4-/m0/s1 Key: SNDPXSYFESPGGJ-BYPYZUCNSA-N; (DL): InChI=1S/C5H11NO2/c1-2-3-4(6)5(7)8/h4H,2-3,6H2,1H3,(H,7,8) Key: SNDPXSYFESPGGJ-UHFFFAOYSA-N; (D): InChI=1S/C5H11NO2/c1-2-3-4(6)5(7)8/h4H,2-3,6H2,1H3,(H,7,8)/t4-/m1/s1 Key: SNDPXSYFESPGGJ-SCSAIBSYSA-N
- SMILES: (L): CCC[C@@H](C(=O)O)N; (DL): CCCC(C(=O)O)N; (D): CCC[C@H](C(=O)O)N

Properties
Chemical formula	C_{5}H_{11}NO_{2}
Molar mass	117.148 g·mol^{−1}
Acidity (pK_{a})	2.36 (carboxyl), 9.76 (amino)
- Except where otherwise noted, data are given for materials in their standard state (at 25 °C [77 °F], 100 kPa). verify (what is ?) Infobox references

Norvaline (abbreviated as Nva) is an amino acid with the formula CH_{3}(CH_{2})_{2}CH(NH_{2})CO_{2}H. The compound is a structural analog of valeric acid and also an isomer of the more common amino acid valine. Like most other α-amino acids, norvaline is chiral. It is a white, water-soluble solid.

== Occurrence ==
Norvaline is a non-proteinogenic unbranched-chain amino acid. It has previously been reported to be a natural component of an antifungal peptide of Bacillus subtilis. Norvaline and other modified unbranched chain amino acids have received attention because they appear to be incorporated in some recombinant proteins found in E. coli. Its biosynthesis has been examined. The incorporation of Nva into peptides reflects the imperfect selectivity of the associated aminoacyl-tRNA synthetase. In Miller–Urey experiments probing prebiotic synthesis of amino acids, norvaline, but also norleucine, are produced.

== Nomenclature ==
Norvaline and norleucine (one hydrocarbon group longer) both possess the nor- prefix for historical reason, despite current conventional usage of the prefix to denote a missing hydrocarbon group (under which they would theoretically be called "dihomoalanine" and "trihomoalanine"). The name is not systematic, and the IUPAC/IUB Joint Commission on Nomenclature recommends that this name should be abandoned and the systematic name should be used.

== Potential uses ==
Norvaline is used as a dietary supplement for bodybuilding. Recently, it was suggested in the treatment of Alzheimer's disease.
