= CH4N2 =

The molecular formula CH_{4}N_{2} (molar mass: 44.06 g/mol, exact mass: 44.0375 u) may refer to:

- Ammonium cyanide
- Diaziridine
- Formamidine
