= L-Photo-leucine =

l-Photo-leucine

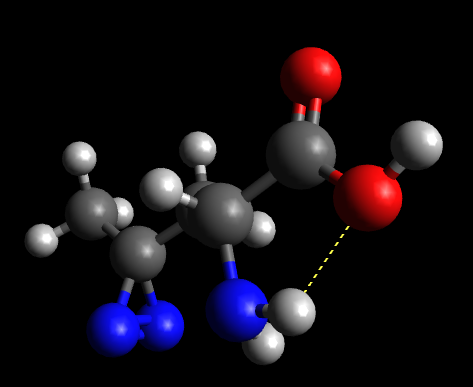

Names
- Preferred IUPAC name (2S)-2-Amino-3-(3-methyl-3H-diazirin-3-yl)propanoic acid
- Other names l-2-Amino-4,4-azi-pentanoic acid 3-(3-Methyl-3-diazirinyl)-alanine

Identifiers
CAS Number	851960-91-3
3D model (JSmol)	Interactive image
ChemSpider	32980228
PubChem CID	24998139
- InChI: InChI=1S/C5H9N3O2/c1-5(7-8-5)2-3(6)4(9)10/h3H,2,6H2,1H3,(H,9,10)/t3-/m0/s1 Key: MJRDGTVDJKACQZ-VKHMYHEASA-N; InChI=1/C5H9N3O2/c1-5(7-8-5)2-3(6)4(9)10/h3H,2,6H2,1H3,(H,9,10)/t3-/m0/s1 Key: MJRDGTVDJKACQZ-VKHMYHEABV
- SMILES: CC1(C[C@H](N)C(O)=O)N=N1

Properties
Chemical formula	C_{5}H_{9}N_{3}O_{2}
Molar mass	143.146 g·mol^{−1}
Solubility in water	10 mg/ml
Acidity (pK_{a})	2.36 (carboxyl) 9.60 (amino)
- Except where otherwise noted, data are given for materials in their standard state (at 25 °C [77 °F], 100 kPa). Infobox references

l-Photo-leucine (pLeu) is a photo-reactive amino acid analog of l-leucine amino acid, suitable for observing and characterizing protein-protein interactions (PPI). When a protein containing this amino acid (A) is exposed to ultraviolet light while interacting with another protein (B), the complex formed from these two proteins (AB) remains attached and can be isolated for study.

Photo-leucine, as well as another photo-reactive amino acid derived from methionine, photo-methionine, were first synthesized in 2005 by Monika Suchanek, Anna Radzikowska and Christoph Thiele from the Max Planck Institute of Molecular Cell Biology and Genetics with the objective of identifying protein to protein interaction throughout a simple western blot test that would provide high specificity.

The resemblance of the photo-reactive amino acids to the natural ones allows the former to avoid the extensive control mechanisms that take place during the protein synthesis within the cell.

== Structure ==
A standard diazirine ring

As mentioned in the introduction, l-photo-leucine is a synthetic derivative of the l-Leucine amino acid. l-photo-leucine is characterized by the presence of a diazirine ring replacing the methyl group of the original amino acid. The diazirine carbon is located in the position where theoretically the 2nd carbon atom of the R radical of l-leucine would be, linked up with the 1st and 3rd carbon of this theoretical R radical. The diazirine ring confers to the photo-leucine its photoreactive property. When irradiated with UV light, it splits releasing nitrogen in gas form and leaving an unbound carbon atom (see Diazirine). In protein-protein interactions (PPI), this atom is attached to the complex formed by the two proteins susceptible of being under study.

The rest of the amino acid has indeed the same structure as the original l-leucine molecule, which includes, as every amino acid, an amino group and a carboxyl group bonded to an α-carbon, and a radical that is attached to this carbon atom. The R chain, contains, in this case, a diazirine ring and two extra carbon atoms connected each to the diazirine carbon as it has been previously mentioned.

Leucine on the left and photoleucine on the right

For use in biology experiments, only the l-enantiomer of the photo-leucine amino acid is synthesized, so that it can substitute for natural l-leucine. (Natural proteins consist only of l-amino acids; see homochirality.)

== Synthesis ==
l-Photo-leucine resembles l-leucine in its structure. However, the latter contains a photo-activatable diazirine ring, which the former does not, and which yields a reactive carbene after the light-induced loss of nitrogen, fact that confers l-photo-leucine its properties. This photo-reactive amino acid is synthesized by α-bromination of the azi-carboxylic acid followed by aminolysis of azi-bromo-carboxylic acid.

The classic procedure for synthesizing photo-leucine is based on the following steps:

- 4,4'-azi-pentanoic acid, CCl_{4} and thionyl chloride are heated to 65 °C for 30 minutes. Then, N-bromosuccinimide, CCl_{4} and 48% HBr are added and the mixture is stirred at 55 °C for 4 hours. The solvent and free bromine are removed under reduced pressure and the residue is extracted with 50 mL CCl_{4}. The solvent is removed and the crude product (2-bromo-4,4'-azi-pentanoyl chloride) dissolved in acetone and hydrolyzed with aqueous NaHCO_{3}. The crude brominated free acid is obtained upon acidification with HCl and extraction with dichloromethane. The solvent is removed and the product filtered through silica gel in isohexane acetate followed by the removal of the solvent. Following this procedure, we are able to add a diazirine ring to the 4,4'-azi-pentanoic acid, and to obtain finally the dl-2-bromo-4,4'-azi-pentanoic acid.
- Aminolysis of dl-2-bromo-4,4'-azi-pentanoic acid is performed in ammonia-saturated methanol and 25% aq ammonia for 5 days at 55 °C. After evaporation of the ammonia, 20 mL of concentrated HCl are added followed by evaporation of the water at reduced pressure. The dry residue is extracted with 20 mL hot methanol and the extract neutralized with N,N-dimetylethylamine. Upon standing for 2 days at -32 °C a precipitate formed which is isolated and re-crystallized twice from 70% ethanol to yield pure dl-2-amino-4,4'-azi-pentonoic acid.
- dl-2-amino-4,4'-azi-pentonoic acid is acetylated to obtain acetylation dl-2-acetamino-4,4'-azi-pentanoic acid followed by enzymatic deacetylation to give pure l-2-amino-4,4'-azi-pentanoic acid, also known as l-photo-leucine.

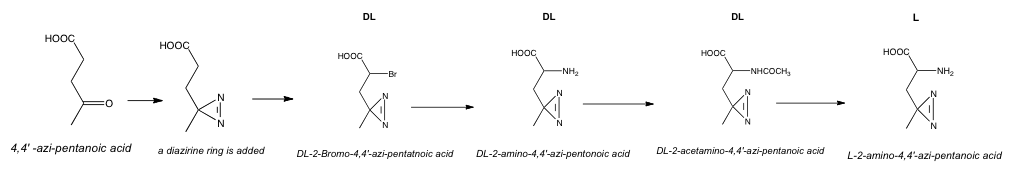

Recently, synthesis of photo-leucine has been improved. This new way of synthesizing photo-leucine requires boc-(S)-photo-leucine, which is prepared via ozonolysis of a commercially available product, followed by formation of the diazirine by de method of Church and Weiss. This route supposes a significant improvement over the original six-step synthesis of (S)-photo-leucine, which proceeded in low yield and required enzymatic resolution of a racemic intermediate.

== Activation ==
l-Photo-leucine acquires its function after being exposed to UV light. This causes diazirine ring of l-photo-leucine to lose its nitrogen atoms in form of nitrogen gas, leaving its carbon atom as a reactive free radical. The bonds established between this carbon, belonging to one protein (A), and atoms belonging to another protein (B) are responsible for the cross-linking properties of l-photo-leucine, which allow it to attach these two peptide chains into a single complex (AB).

The appropriate wavelength to activate the l-photo-leucine molecule ranges from 320 to 370 nanometers. Lamps with higher power are more effective in accomplishing this objective and do so in less time. The ideal wavelength for the activation of the photo-leucine amino acid is of 345 nm.

To increase efficiency, a shallow and uncovered plate must be used. Also, rotation of the samples located under the UV right may be necessary to make sure they receive even UV irradiation, and thus to, yet again, improve the cross-linking efficiency. If the cross-linking is done in vivo, within living cells, these must be exposed to the UV radiation during a period of 15 minutes or less.

== Uses ==
In the absence of the original amino acid (l-leucine) in an environment, l-photo-leucine is used just as its naturally occurring analog in the protein processing mechanisms of the cell. Therefore, it can be used as a substitute for leucine in the primary structure of the protein. This property of photo-leucine is very useful for studying protein-protein interactions (PPIs), due to the fact that the photo-leucine molecule, because of its molecular structure, participates in the covalent cross-linking of proteins in the protein-protein interaction (PPI) domains when it is activated by ultraviolet (UV) light. This fact allows to determine and describe stable and transient protein interactions within cells without using any additional chemical cross-linkers, which could damage the cell structure being studied.

The study of these protein-protein interactions is important because they are crucial in organizing cellular processes in space and time. In fact, interest in protein-protein interactions is not confined only to basic research: many of these interactions involved in viral fusion or in growth-factor signaling are promising targets for antiviral and anticancer drugs. Photo-affinity labeling is a powerful tool to identify protein targets of biologically active small molecules and to probe the structure of ligand binding sites, reason due to which photo amino acids, including photo-leucine, are so useful.

=== Protein labelling ===
Monika Suchanek, Anna Radzikowska and Christoph Thiele carried out an experiment in which they had successfully managed to label proteins from the cells of a monkey's kidney (COS7).

These cells were grown in a high-glucose medium, from which a sample of 3 cm² was removed to proceed with the western blotting. At about 70% of confluence, the initial medium was replaced by another one lacking the amino acids methionine, leucine, isoleucine and valine, as well as phenol red.

Afterwards, photo-amino acids were added to a final concentration of 4 mM of photo-leucine and photo-isoleucine, 1.7 mM of photo-methionine, and cultivated for 22 hours. Once the time was over, cells were washed using PBS and UV-irradiated using a 200-W high pressure mercury lamp with a glass filter that removed wavelengths under 310 nm during 1 to 3 minutes. This did not affect to the viability of the cell (which only was altered after 10 minutes of irradiation). Cell was driven to lysis and subsequent western blotting to analyse the isolated cross-linked complexes.

MacKinnon A. L. et al. used photo-leucine to label proteins in a crude membrane fraction, which allowed them to identify the central part of a translocation channel within the membrane that is the target of the cyclodepsipeptide inhibitor.

== Advantages of photo-leucine as a cross-linker ==
Traditionally, the recognition of protein-protein interactions was carried out through chemical cross-linking, that involved the use of moderately reactive bifunctional reagent, commonly attached to free amino groups. However, photochemical cross-linking is much more specific due to the short lifetime of the excited intermediates. In addition, photochemical cross-linking does not interfere with the antibodies recognition whilst the former does.

But photo-leucine's advantages go further, because in addition to having a lot of advantages, it doesn't have negative effects. For example, although unnatural amino acids are in general toxic to cells, photo-leucine has been proved not to have any substantial effect to cell viability. Those results have been corroborate by many experiments. For example, an essay with Escherichia coli-galactosidase showed that the addition of either of the three photo-amino acids or of a mixture of them had no effect on enzyme activity. That helps to conclude that photo-amino acids are nontoxic to cultivated mammalian cells and can, at least partially, functionally replace their natural forms.

However, currently photo-reactive amino acids are used in combination with chemical cross-linkers in order to achieve the most reliable results possible within protein-protein interaction studies.
