= Norleucine =

Names
- Preferred IUPAC name (2S)-2-Aminohexanoic acid
- Other names Caprine; Glycoleucine

Identifiers
CAS Number	327-57-1 (2S)
3D model (JSmol)	Interactive image
Beilstein Reference	1721748
ChEBI	CHEBI:36405
ChemSpider	401917
DrugBank	DB04419
ECHA InfoCard	100.009.512
EC Number	210-462-7
Gmelin Reference	464584
KEGG	C01933
MeSH	Norleucine
PubChem CID	9475
RTECS number	RC6308000
UNII	832C8OV84S
CompTox Dashboard (EPA)	DTXSID40861874
- InChI: InChI=1S/C6H13NO2/c1-2-3-4-5(7)6(8)9/h5H,2-4,7H2,1H3,(H,8,9) Key: LRQKBLKVPFOOQJ-UHFFFAOYSA-N
- SMILES: CCCCC(N)C(O)=O

Properties
Chemical formula	C_{6}H_{13}NO_{2}
Molar mass	131.175 g·mol^{−1}
Melting point	301 °C (574 °F; 574 K) (decomposes)
Solubility in water	16 g/L at 23 °C
Acidity (pK_{a})	2.39 (carboxyl), 9.76 (amino)

Related compounds
Related Aminoacids	Norvaline (2-amino-pentanoic); Aminocaproic acid (6-amino-hexanoic); Leucine (2-amino-4-methyl-pentanoic); Isoleucine (2-amino-3-methyl-pentanoic); Lysine (2,6-diamino-hexanoic)
Related compounds	Caproic acid (hexanoic)
- Except where otherwise noted, data are given for materials in their standard state (at 25 °C [77 °F], 100 kPa). verify (what is ?) Infobox references

Norleucine (Note: The use of the name norleucine is discouraged as it is a misnomer, given than nor- is defined for an amino acid with one less methylene group than found in the proteinogenic form.) (abbreviated as Nle) is an amino acid with the formula CH_{3}(CH_{2})_{3}CH(NH_{2})CO_{2}H. A systematic name for this compound is 2-aminohexanoic acid. The compound is an isomer of the more common amino acid leucine. Like most other α-amino acids, norleucine is chiral. It is a white, water-soluble solid.

== Occurrence ==
Together with norvaline, norleucine is found in small amounts in some bacterial strains where its concentration can approach millimolar. Its biosynthesis has been examined. It arises via the action of 2-isopropylmalate synthase on α-ketobutyrate. The incorporation of Nle into peptides reflects the imperfect selectivity of the associated aminoacyl-tRNA synthetase. In Miller–Urey experiments probing prebiotic synthesis of amino acids, norleucine and especially norvaline are formed.

== Uses ==
It is nearly isosteric with methionine, even though it does not contain sulfur. For this reason, norleucine has been used to probe the role of methionine in Amyloid-β peptide (AβP) the central constituent of senile plaques in Alzheimer's disease. A study showed that with the substitution of the methionine at the 35 position with norleucine the neurotoxic effects of the Aβ peptides were completely negated.

== See also ==
- Leucines, description of the isomers of leucine
- norvaline, isomer of valine that has similar biochemistry to that of norleucine.
