= Photo-reactive amino acid analog =

Photo-reactive amino acid analogs are artificial analogs of natural amino acids that can be used for crosslinking of protein complexes. Photo-reactive amino acid analogs may be incorporated into proteins and peptides in vivo or in vitro. Photo-reactive amino acid analogs in common use are photoreactive diazirine analogs to leucine and methionine, and para-benzoylphenylalanine. Upon exposure to ultraviolet light, they are activated and covalently bind to interacting proteins that are within a few angstroms of the photo-reactive amino acid analog.

L-Photo-leucine and L-photo-methionine are analogs of the naturally occurring L-leucine and L-methionine amino acids that are endogenously incorporated into the primary sequence of proteins during synthesis using the normal translation machinery. They are then ultraviolet light (UV)-activated to covalently crosslink proteins within protein–protein interaction domains in their native in-vivo environment. The method enables the determination and characterization of both stable and transient protein interactions in cells without the addition of chemical crosslinkers and associated solvents that can adversely affect the cell biology being studied in the experiment.

When used in combination with limiting media that is devoid of leucine and methionine, the photo-activatable derivatives are treated like naturally occurring amino acids by the cellular protein synthesis machinery. As a result, they can be substituted for leucine or methionine in the primary structure of proteins. Photo-leucine and photo-methionine derivatives contain diazirine rings that are activated when exposed to UV light to become reactive intermediates that form covalent bonds with nearby protein side chains and backbones. Naturally interacting proteins within the cell can be instantly trapped by photoactivation of the diazirine-containing proteins in the cultured cells. Crosslinked protein complexes can be detected by decreased mobility on SDS-PAGE followed by Western blotting, size exclusion chromatography, sucrose density gradient sedimentation or mass spectrometry.

Photo-reactive amino acid analogs

pLeu

pMet
Corresponding natural amino acids

Leu

Met
