= 27-Norcholestane =

Names
- IUPAC name 27-Nor-5ξ-cholestane
- Systematic IUPAC name (1R,3aS,3bR,5aΞ,9aS,9bS,11aR)-1-[(2S)-Heptan-2-yl]-9a,11a-dimethylhexadecahydro-1H-cyclopenta[a]phenanthrene

Identifiers
CAS Number	352557-10-9
3D model (JSmol)	Interactive image
ChemSpider	65791227
PubChem CID	53954564
- InChI: InChI=1S/C26H46/c1-5-6-7-10-19(2)22-14-15-23-21-13-12-20-11-8-9-17-25(20,3)24(21)16-18-26(22,23)4/h19-24H,5-18H2,1-4H3/t19-,20?,21+,22-,23+,24+,25+,26-/m1/s1; Key: JGTJUUFDASCIKN-LBSJJPSCSA-N
- SMILES: CCCCC[C@@H](C)[C@H]1CC[C@@H]2[C@@]1(CC[C@H]3[C@H]2CCC4[C@@]3(CCCC4)C)C

Properties
Chemical formula	C_{26}H_{46}
Molar mass	358.654 g·mol^{−1}
- Except where otherwise noted, data are given for materials in their standard state (at 25 °C [77 °F], 100 kPa). Infobox references

27-Norcholestane, is a chemical compound with the formula C_{26}H_{46}, that is a steroid derivative. 27-Norcholestane is used as a biomarker to constrain the source age of sediments and petroleum through the ratio between 24-norcholestane and 27-norcholestane (norcholestane ratio, NCR), especially when used with other age diagnostic biomarkers, like oleanane.

== See also ==
- Biomarker
- Cholestane
- Nor-
