= 19-Norcholestane =

Names
- IUPAC name 19-Nor-5ξ-cholestane
- Systematic IUPAC name (1R,3aS,3bR,5aΞ,9aS,9bR,11aR)-11a-Methyl-1-[(2R)-6-methylheptan-2-yl]hexadecahydro-1H-cyclopenta[a]phenanthrene

Identifiers
3D model (JSmol)	Interactive image
PubChem CID	53761441
- InChI: InChI=1S/C26H46/c1-18(2)8-7-9-19(3)24-14-15-25-23-13-12-20-10-5-6-11-21(20)22(23)16-17-26(24,25)4/h18-25H,5-17H2,1-4H3/t19-,20?,21+,22-,23-,24-,25+,26-/m1/s1 Key: DIEIYOCAHJJDBL-CGLPLZRSSA-N
- SMILES: C[C@H](CCCC(C)C)[C@H]1CC[C@@H]2[C@@]1(CC[C@H]3[C@H]2CCC4[C@@H]3CCCC4)C

Properties
Chemical formula	C_{26}H_{46}
Molar mass	358.654 g·mol^{−1}
- Except where otherwise noted, data are given for materials in their standard state (at 25 °C [77 °F], 100 kPa). Infobox references

19-Norcholestane is a 26-carbon (C26) sterane.

== See also ==
- 19-Norpregnane
- Cholestane
- Nor-
