= Graham reaction =

Oxidation reaction in organic chemistry

In organic chemistry, the Graham reaction is an oxidation reaction that converts an amidine into a diazirine using a hypohalite reagent. The halide of the hypohalite oxidant, or another similar anionic additive to the reaction, is retained as a substituent on the diazirine product. The reaction was first reported in 1965. Various reaction mechanisms have been proposed.

Amidine substrates for the reaction can easily be formed from the corresponding nitriles via the Pinner reaction. The halide substituent in the diazirine product can be displaced by a various nucleophiles.
