= 21-Norcholestane =

Names
- IUPAC name 21-Nor-5ξ-cholestane
- Systematic IUPAC name (1S,3aS,3bS,5aΞ,9aS,9bS,11aR)-9a,11a-Dimethyl-1-(5-methylhexyl)hexadecahydro-1H-cyclopenta[a]phenanthrene

Identifiers
3D model (JSmol)	Interactive image; (5α)-21-Norcholestane: Interactive image
PubChem CID	15807965; 135072882 (5α)-21-Norcholestane
- InChI: InChI=1S/C26H46/c1-19(2)9-5-6-10-21-13-15-23-22-14-12-20-11-7-8-17-25(20,3)24(22)16-18-26(21,23)4/h19-24H,5-18H2,1-4H3/t20-,21-,22-,23-,24-,25-,26+/m0/s1 Key: NJAGGVRNPGTXRG-JGWBXBOGSA-N; InChI=1S/C26H46/c1-19(2)9-5-6-10-21-13-15-23-22-14-12-20-11-7-8-17-25(20,3)24(22)16-18-26(21,23)4/h19-24H,5-18H2,1-4H3/t20?,21-,22-,23-,24-,25-,26+/m0/s1 Key: NJAGGVRNPGTXRG-ALEVNZSUSA-N
- SMILES: CC(C)CCCC[C@H]1CC[C@@H]2[C@@]1(CC[C@H]3[C@H]2CCC4[C@@]3(CCCC4)C)C; (5α)-21-Norcholestane: CC(C)CCCC[C@H]1CC[C@@H]2[C@@]1(CC[C@H]3[C@H]2CC[C@H]4[C@@]3(CCCC4)C)C

Properties
Chemical formula	C_{26}H_{46}
Molar mass	358.654 g·mol^{−1}
- Except where otherwise noted, data are given for materials in their standard state (at 25 °C [77 °F], 100 kPa). Infobox references

21-Norcholestane, or 17β-Isoheptylandrostane is a 26-carbon (C26) sterane, found in eogene lacustrine sediments.

== See also ==
- Androstane
- Cholestane
- Nor-
