= 24-Norcholestane =

Names
- IUPAC name 24-Nor-5ξ-cholestane
- Systematic IUPAC name (1R,3aS,3bR,5aΞ,9aS,9bS,11aR)-9a,11a-Dimethyl-1-[(2R)-5-methylhexan-2-yl]hexadecahydro-1H-cyclopenta[a]phenanthrene

Identifiers
CAS Number	38676-20-9
3D model (JSmol)	Interactive image
PubChem CID	163194335
CompTox Dashboard (EPA)	DTXSID101336522
- InChI: InChI=1S/C26H46/c1-18(2)9-10-19(3)22-13-14-23-21-12-11-20-8-6-7-16-25(20,4)24(21)15-17-26(22,23)5/h18-24H,6-17H2,1-5H3/t19-,20?,21+,22-,23+,24+,25+,26-/m1/s1; Key: OSKAUJPRHJFGLQ-LBSJJPSCSA-N
- SMILES: C[C@H](CCC(C)C)[C@H]1CC[C@@H]2[C@@]1(CC[C@H]3[C@H]2CCC4[C@@]3(CCCC4)C)C

Properties
Chemical formula	C_{26}H_{46}
Molar mass	358.654 g·mol^{−1}
- Except where otherwise noted, data are given for materials in their standard state (at 25 °C [77 °F], 100 kPa). Infobox references

24-Norcholestane, a steroid derivative, is used as a biomarker to constrain the source age of sediments and petroleum through the ratio between 24-norcholestane and 27-norcholestane (24-norcholestane ratio, NCR), especially when used with other age diagnostic biomarkers, like oleanane. While the origins of this compound are still unknown, it is thought that they are derived from diatoms due to their identification in diatom rich sediments and environments. In addition, it was found that 24-norcholestane levels increased in correlation with diatom evolution. Another possible source of 24-norcholestane is from dinoflagellates, albeit to a much lower extent.

== Structure ==
24-Norcholestane is a tetracyclic compound, with 20R,5α(H),14α(H),17α(H) stereochemistry, derived from steroids or sterols. It consists of three 6-membered rings and one 5-membered ring, with carbon 24 removed from the side chain off of C17.

== Background ==
24-Norcholestane is a 26-carbon (C26) sterane created from the removal of carbon 24 from cholestane. It has been found that 24-norcholestane is relatively high in abundance, up to 10% of sterols, in Thalassiosira aff. antarctica, a diatom. It has also been found in the dinoflagellate Gymnodinium simplex, albeit at much lower levels (around 0.2% of sterols).

=== Origins ===
Since 24-norcholestane origins are still unknown, the synthesis of it is also unknown as well. However, some pathways have been proposed. Possible sources of 24-norcholestane include 24-norcholesterol, which is present in many marine invertebrates and some algae in addition to diatoms and dinoflagellates.

== Measurement techniques ==
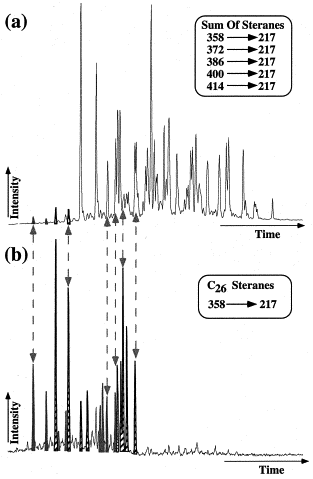
Since C26 steranes are generally present in an order of magnitude lower than the more common steranes (i.e. C27, C28, and C29), GC/MS/MS is used to obtain better analysis of the C26 steranes. (a) shows the summation of GC/MS/MS transitions of all steranes, whereas (b) shows the transitions for C26 steranes only and where the peaks map to in the summation.

Samples are collected from rocks or crude oils. Asphaltenes are first extracted before the sample is fractionated by passing through a silica column and eluting with solvents of increasing polarity. Traditional gas chromatography-mass spectrometry (GC/MS) techniques are not used, as C26 steranes are present in samples in much lower quantities, generally a magnitude lower, as compared to more common C27, C28, and C29 steranes. Instead, GC/MS/MS (GC-tandem MS) techniques are used for better analysis of C26 steranes.

== Use as a biomarker ==
A 1993 study found high levels of 24-norcholestane in Middle Miocene marine siliceous sediments from Japan.

In a 1998 study, it was found that 24-norcholestanes were present in higher levels than their 27-norcholestane analogs in Cretaeous or younger oils and sediments. Diatom fossils were first recognized in the Jurassic age, with corresponding samples having NCR>0.2. Cretaceous age samples had NCR>0.4, and Oligocene age and younger samples had NCR>0.6. Thus, having higher NCR ratios is indicative of a younger age. It appears that 24-norcholestane is not present until the emergence of diatoms.

A 2008 study found that 24-norcholestanes also correlated with dinoflagellates in lacustrine sediments in China.

In a 2012 study, 24-norcholestanes were found in oils and Cambrian–Ordovician source rocks from the Tarim Basin in China at much higher levels than in the 1998 study (NCRs were equivalent to Cretaceous source rocks). Since diatoms do not appear at this time, the authors contribute these abnormally high levels to dinoflagellates.

== See also ==
- Biomarker
- Cholestane
- Nor-
