= L-Photo-methionine =

Names
- IUPAC name (S)-2-amino-4-(3-methyl-3H-diazirin-3-yl)butanoic acid
- Other names L-2-amino-5,5-azi-hexanoic acid

Identifiers
CAS Number	851960-68-4
3D model (JSmol)	Interactive image
ChemSpider	61327213
PubChem CID	130320680
- InChI: InChI=1S/C6H11N3O2/c1-6(8-9-6)3-2-4(7)5(10)11/h4H,2-3,7H2,1H3,(H,10,11)/t4-/m0/s1 Key: YHZILLMARKDNKF-BYPYZUCNSA-N
- SMILES: CC1(N=N1)CC[C@@H](C(=O)O)N

Properties
Chemical formula	C_{6}H_{11}N_{3}O_{2}
Molar mass	157.173 g·mol^{−1}
Solubility in water	6 mg/mL

Hazards
- GHS labelling
Hazard statements	H315, H319, H335
Precautionary statements	P261, P305, P338, P351
- Except where otherwise noted, data are given for materials in their standard state (at 25 °C [77 °F], 100 kPa). Infobox references

L-Photo-methionine (pMet) is a photo-reactive amino acid analog of L-methionine that was synthetically in 2005. It replaces the bridging sulfide linker of methionine with a diazirine ring.

== Synthesis ==
Racemic Photo-Methionine is synthesized from 4,4'-azi-pentanal by the Strecker amino acid synthesis. The L enantiomer is separated by enzymatic resolution of the acetamide.

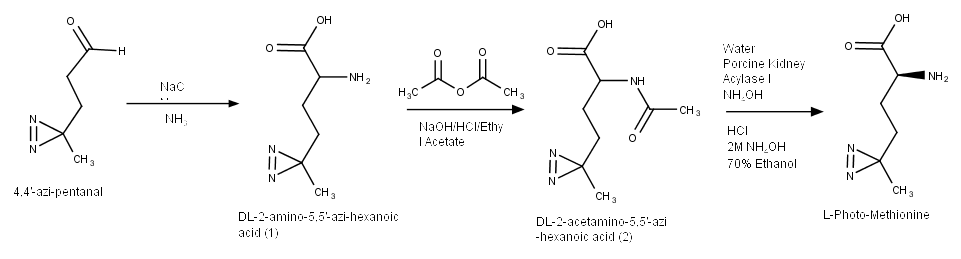
Full Synthesis of L-Photo-Methionine

== Photoactivation of methionine ==
Photo-methionine is photo-reactive due to the diazirine ring. Once this ring has become exposed to UV light, nitrogen leaves as nitrogen gas (N_{2}) and forms the highly reactive intermediate carbene that cross-links to other structures in the vicinity. This type of cross-linking provides high specificity due to the short lived nature of the intermediate and the amino acid does not disrupt the protein's function or structure dramatically. Research had found that this activation is the rate-limiting step; not the cross-linkage.

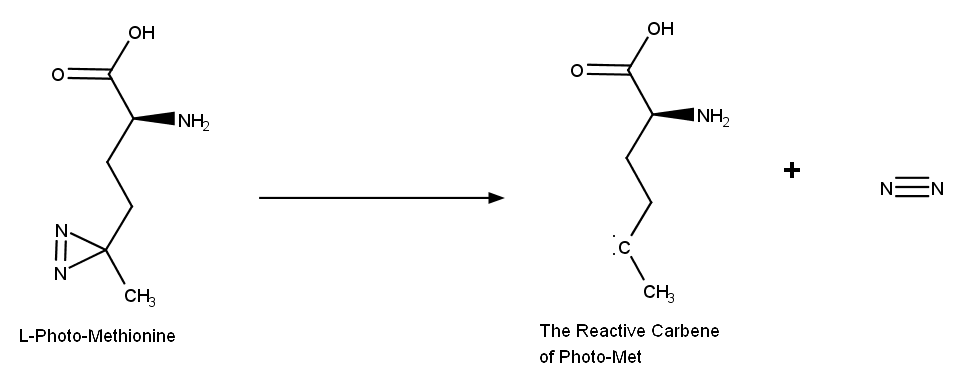
Carbene Form of Methionine

== Usage of Photo-Methionine ==
=== Protein Interactions ===
==== Complex and Function of Membrane Protein in Cholesterol Homeostasis ====
As mentioned before, scientists Monika Suchanek, Anna Radzikowski, and Christoph Thiele wanted to study protein-protein interaction in their natural environment. Specifically, the membrane proteins (in a complex and are SCAP, Insig-1, and SREBP) that regulate cholesterol homeostasis so they wanted to know what their function was and the complex structure. What they had found was that using this photo-reactive amino acid was incorporated efficiently into the protein by mammalian cells, but did not need to use modified tRNAs (transfer RNA's) or AARS's (aminoacyl tRNA syntheses) which that allowed the specific cross-linking needed. This cross-linking could be determined by western blotting and they had discovered a direct interaction between Insig-1 and PGRMC1 (a progesterone-binding membrane protein). All four of the membrane proteins are found in the endoplasmic reticulum and the complex responds to low cholesterol levels. Cells (COS7) that had HA (hemagglutinin tagged PGRMC1) and Myc tagged Insig-1 were grown with and without photo-Met. In the presence of photo-Met, Insig-1 and SCAP had cross-linked with PGRMC1; specifically, Insig-1 cross-linked had a strong band. The cross-linking was detected by immunoprecipitating detergent-extracts with an antibody to HA then the precipitant was tested for Insig-1 using western blotting with the antibody for Myc. An identical band was found doing the reverse order of the detection; meaning Myc antibody was immunoprecipitated then followed by blotting with the HA antibody. So, the method had proven to work that photo-Met could cross-link proteins, but the physiological implications of this cross-linking has yet to be determined.

==== Usage of Protein Nanoprobes to Study Protein-Protein Interactions with Mass Spectrometry ====
Protein was studied using a protein nanoprobe (that enables cross-linking) that introduced photo-methionine within the protein (during the recombinant expression) which lead to the protein keeping its reserved structure while having the ability to be mapped out for its interactions. The model was used as a region of contact surface that is involved in a well-known interaction (homodimerization) between two molecules of 14-3-3ζ protein. Once the photo-methionine is introduced and has become activated using UV-light, it can cross-link with no specificity (meaning no group) and the links have zero-length. High resolution mass spectrometry or MS can (even MS/MS) be used then to determine the cross-linked residues and the reaction radius; allowing the researchers to characterize and research the homodimerization of the protein. The usage of the high-resolution MS with photo-methionine has its advantages as it again allows the protein to be in its native state, there are reasonable time scales while using small quantities of the protein. There are also fewer limitations on the reaction specificity and restrictions using a photo-active cross-linker (photo-methionine) compared to chemical cross-linking. This method of combined photo-initiated cross-linking from the protein nanoprobe in tandem with MS could be useful to characterize not only homodimer formation but also oligomers and in theory; heteromers (such as the composition of the protein-protein mixture and its functionality).

==== Ability to Study Cytochrome P450 Electron-Transport Chain using Photo-cytochrome b_{5} ====
Cytochrome b_{5} was synthesized with photo-methionine to map the protein-protein interactions while also identifying its structure to study the mammalian mixed function oxidase system (also known as the MFO). This system is located in the membrane of the endoplasmic reticulum and it is composed of cytochrome P450, NADPH: cytochrome P450 reductase, and cytochrome b_{5} along with NADH: cytochrome b_{5} reductase. Once the cytochrome b_{5} complex had photo-methionine incorporated (meaning photo-met was substituted in place of methionine and now photo-cyt b_{5}), photo-cyt b_{5} and cytochrome P450 were put under UV-light and the products were able to be studied using SDS-Page; this method had shown three cross-links. The photo-methionine had proven successful in mapping photo-cyt b_{5} as the MALDI-TOF method shown three oligomers (from chymotryptic peptides) that were composed of photo-cyt b_{5} and cytochrome P450 in molecular weight ratio's of 1:1, 1:2, and 2:1. What makes photo-methionine here so useful in studying cytochrome P450 and cytochrome b_{5} is that this method not only mapped protein-protein interfaces not only in regions exposed to solvent, but also in the native environment; the membrane. A typical cross-linking method can only work in solvent exposed regions, proving once again that photo-methionine is useful to map these protein-protein interactions with the protein in their native environment.

=== Protein Structure ===
==== Analysis of Nidogen-1 interacting with Laminin γ1 ====
Laminin's are non-collagenous proteins found in basement membranes and form networks through non-covalent self-interactions. Nidogens (also known as entactins) are sulfated monomeric glycoproteins that are ubiquitously present in basement membranes of higher organisms. Nidogens help with the formation of the basement. With both laminins and nidogens present, both interact with each other to have a stoichiometry relationship of 1:1 in a complex. In order to study the short arm of laminin γ1, photo methionine introduced both to nidogen-1, laminin γ1 LEb2-4, and laminin γ1 short arm to see if this photo-cross linking method could map out the structure. MS/MS analysis was done before cross-linking to find only 13-25% of methionine's had been incorporated, but once UV-A-induced or another cross-linker, BS^{2}G-mediated cross-linked (a homobifunctional cross-linker), the percentage of photo-methionine's had increased to 35%. Both cross-linkers had shown extra structural insight both computationally and experimentally to help with understanding the functions.

==== Revelation of Dimeric Structure and Oligomeric Structure ====
Cyclooxygenase-2 (COX-2) and microsomal prostaglandin E_{2} synthase-1 (mPGES-1) structures were studied using both photo-methionine (photo-activatable) and bifunctional cross linkers. Photo-methionine used in COX-2 had shown just as the bifunctional cross-linker that there was a dimeric structure which this was consistent with the crystal structure of the enzyme. In mPGES-1, the human cells (A549) had been treated with disuccinimidyl suberate (chemical cross-linker) had yielded a dimer of 33kDa and a trimer of 45kDa while it was treated with photo-methionine had yielded a dimer of the same molecular weight (33kDa) and two putative trimers (50kDa and 55kDa). Once a mPGES-1 inhibitor (MF63) was introduced; this had inhibited the formation of the 50kDa and 55kDa complexes. The dimer and trimer yielded by the chemical cross-linker was not affected by the inhibitor. Yet, photo-methionine nor disuccinimidyl suberate had not shown any protein-protein interactions between COX-2 and mPGES-1 and this could be due to various reasons. For photo-methionine; one could be due to the low incorporation at this time as it was 0.7%. So, for mPGES-1; this has 152 amino acids so only one photo-methionine would be incorporated per monomer. That also means not one specific methionine would be replaced so that results in a heterogeneous population of mPGES-1 resulting in different cross-linking. Even though it did not show any protein-protein interactions, it could be used to detect inhibitor-induced protein conformational changes in the cell membranes on top of determining oligomeric structures.

==== Escherichia coli cells ====
Photo-methionine can be used to label recombinant proteins in Escherichia coli cells; though methionine in general is a rare amino acid so that means it could only give limited structural data. Nevertheless, photo-methionine was incorporated into Ca^{2+} regulating protein calmodulin (CaM that was 17-kDa) that has nine methionine's and studied via mass spectrometry (MS). What makes this method different is the use of mineral salts medium instead of DMEM (Dulbecco's Modified Eagle's Limiting Medium) or dialyzed fetal bovine serum for the incorporation into the cells. Using the mineral salt medium allowed the cells to be grown from the beginning in order to eliminate complicated steps with other protocols (incubating the cells in LB medium, followed by washing, and further incubating in the depleted medium), meaning that photo-methionine could be incorporated at the very beginning of the cell growth that had a high yield above 30%. Photo-methionine had shown no damage during the cell growth process and once photo-activated by UV-A light, CaM had nine distinct cross-link sites once MS had determined there was peaks of photo-methionine labeled CaM. Not only can photo-methionine be used for mapping 3D protein structure, studying protein-protein interactions, but now hydrophobic regions in the protein.
