= Diaziridine =

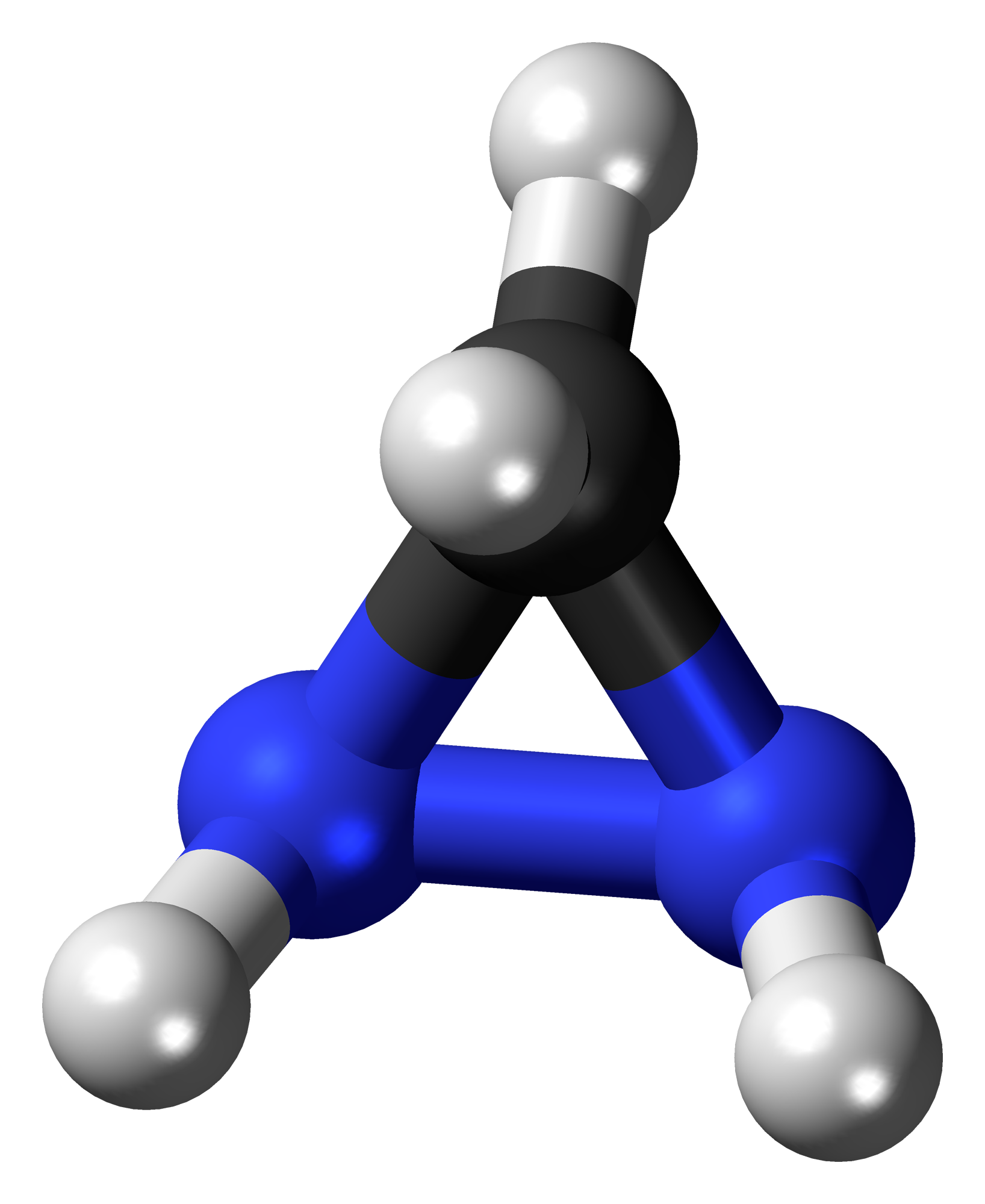

Names
- Preferred IUPAC name Diaziridine
- Systematic IUPAC name Diazacyclopropane
- Other names Diazirane; 1,2-Diazacyclopropane

Identifiers
CAS Number	463-64-9
3D model (JSmol)	Interactive image
ChemSpider	4236879
PubChem CID	5059686
CompTox Dashboard (EPA)	DTXSID701029321
- InChI: InChI=1S/CH4N2/c1-2-3-1/h2-3H,1H2 Key: DIXBSCZRIZDQGC-UHFFFAOYSA-N; InChI=1/CH4N2/c1-2-3-1/h2-3H,1H2 Key: DIXBSCZRIZDQGC-UHFFFAOYAM
- SMILES: N1NC1

Properties
Chemical formula	CH_{4}N_{2}
Molar mass	44.057 g·mol^{−1}
- Except where otherwise noted, data are given for materials in their standard state (at 25 °C [77 °F], 100 kPa). verify (what is ?) Infobox references

A diaziridine is a heterocyclic compound containing two nitrogen atoms in a three-membered ring. Diaziridines can be considered as strained hydrazines. Unlike most amine types of structures, the nitrogen atoms of diaziridines are configurationally stable because the ring strain prevents Walden inversion. As a result, there can be various stereoisomeric forms of this structure.

They are usually synthesized by treating a carbonyl compound with an aminating reagent like hydroxylamine-O-sulfonic acid and either ammonia or a primary aliphatic amine under slightly basic conditions. The final step is based on the intramolecular cyclization of an aminal.

== Reactions ==
- Unsubstituted diaziridines are often directly oxidized (I_{2}/NEt_{3}) to the more stable diazirines.
- They can undergo ring expansion reaction with electrophilic reagents like ketenes or isocyanates.
- Some derivatives have neurologic activity.
