= Diazirine =

Organic compound containing the cyclic group >CN2

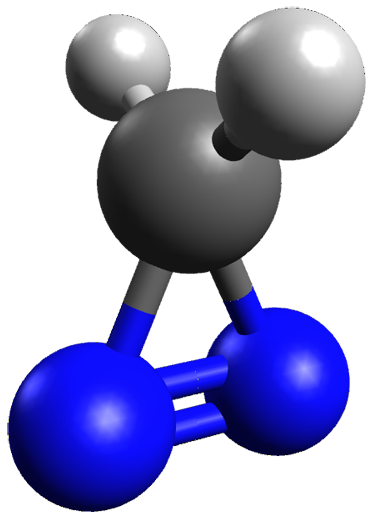

Identifiers
CAS Number	3H: 157-22-2
3D model (JSmol)	3H: Interactive image
Beilstein Reference	605387
ChEBI	3H: CHEBI:51620
ChemSpider	3H: 71291
PubChem CID	3H: 78958
CompTox Dashboard (EPA)	3H: DTXSID80166178
- InChI: InChI=1S/CH2N2/c1-2-3-1/h1H2 Key: GKVDXUXIAHWQIK-UHFFFAOYSA-N
- SMILES: 3H: C1N=N1

Properties
Chemical formula	CH_{2}N_{2}
Molar mass	42.041 g·mol^{−1}

Related compounds
Related compounds	1H-Diazirine
- Except where otherwise noted, data are given for materials in their standard state (at 25 °C [77 °F], 100 kPa). Infobox references

A generic diazirine

In organic chemistry, a diazirine is an organic molecule consisting of a carbon bound to two nitrogen atoms, which are double-bonded to each other, forming a cyclopropene-like ring, 3H-diazirine (>CN_{2}). Diazirines are isomeric with diazocarbon groups (>C=N=N), and like them can serve as precursors for carbenes by loss of a molecule of dinitrogen. For example, irradiation of diazirines with ultraviolet light leads to carbene insertion into various C−H, N−H, and O−H bonds. Hence, diazirines have grown in popularity as small, photo-reactive, crosslinking reagents. They are often used in photoaffinity labeling studies to observe a variety of interactions, including ligand-receptor, ligand-enzyme, protein-protein, and protein-nucleic acid interactions.

== Synthesis ==
A number of methods exist in the literature for the preparation of diazirines, which begin from a variety of reagents.

=== Synthesis from ketones ===
Generally, synthetic schemes that begin with ketones (>C=O) involve conversion of the ketone with the desired substituents to diaziridines (>CN_{2}H_{2}). These diaziridines are then subsequently oxidized to form the desired diazirines.

Diaziridines can be prepared from ketones by oximation, followed by tosylation (or mesylation), and then finally by treatment with ammonia (NH_{3}). Generally, oximation reactions are performed by reacting the ketone with hydroxylammonium chloride (NH_{3}OH^{−}Cl^{+}) under heat in the presence of a base such as pyridine. Subsequent tosylation or mesylation of the alpha-substituted oxygen with tosyl or mesyl chloride in the presence of base yields the tosyl or mesyl oxime. The final treatment of the tosyl or mesyl oxime with ammonia produces the diaziridine.

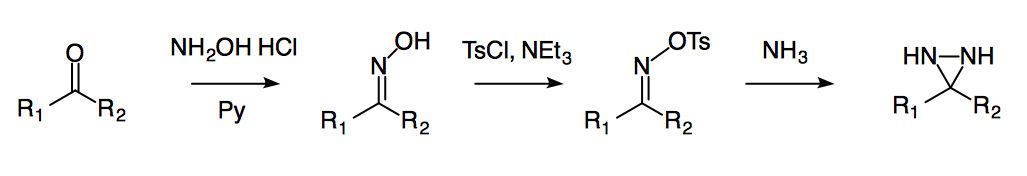
Generic diaziridine synthesis by oximation, tosylation, and treatment with ammonia.

Diaziridines can be also produced directly by the reaction of ketones with ammonia in the presence of an aminating agent such as a monochloramine or hydroxyl amine O-sulfonic acid.

Diaziridines can be oxidized to diazirines by a number of methods. These include oxidation by chromium-based reagents such as the Jones oxidation, oxidation by iodine and triethylamine, oxidation by silver oxide, oxidation by oxalyl chloride, or even electrochemical oxidation on a platinum-titanium anode.

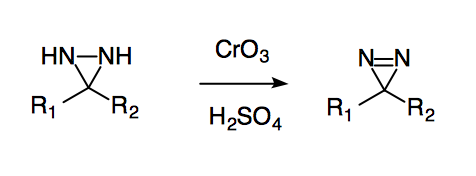
Jones oxidation of a generic diaziridine to a diazirine.

=== Synthesis by Graham reaction ===
Diazirines can be alternatively formed in a one-pot process using the Graham reaction, starting from amidines. This reaction yields a halogenated diazirine, whose halogen can be displaced by various nucleophilic reagents.

The Graham reaction as a method of diazirine synthesis, where X = Cl or Br.

The diazirine exchange reaction using various anions and the counterion tetra-n-butylammonium.

== Chemistry ==
Upon irradiation with UV light, diazirines form reactive carbene species. The carbene may exist in the singlet form, in which the two free electrons occupy the same orbital, or the triplet form, with two unpaired electrons in different orbitals.

Diazirines can be decomposed by using UV-light.

=== Triplet vs singlet carbene products ===
The substituents on the diazirine affect which carbene species is generated upon irradiation and subsequent photolytic cleavage. Diazirine substituents that are electron donating in nature can donate electron density to the empty p-orbital of the carbene that will be formed, and hence can stabilize the singlet state. For example, phenyldiazirine produces phenylcarbene in the singlet carbene state whereas 3-chloro-3-[(4-nitrophenyl)methyl]diazirine or trifluoromethylphenyldiazirine produce the respective triplet carbene products.

Electron donating substituents can also encourage photoisomerization to the linear diazo compound, rather than the singlet carbene, and hence these compounds are unfavorable for use in biological assays. On the other hand, trifluoroaryldiazirines in particular show favorable stability and photolytic qualities and are most commonly used in biological applications.

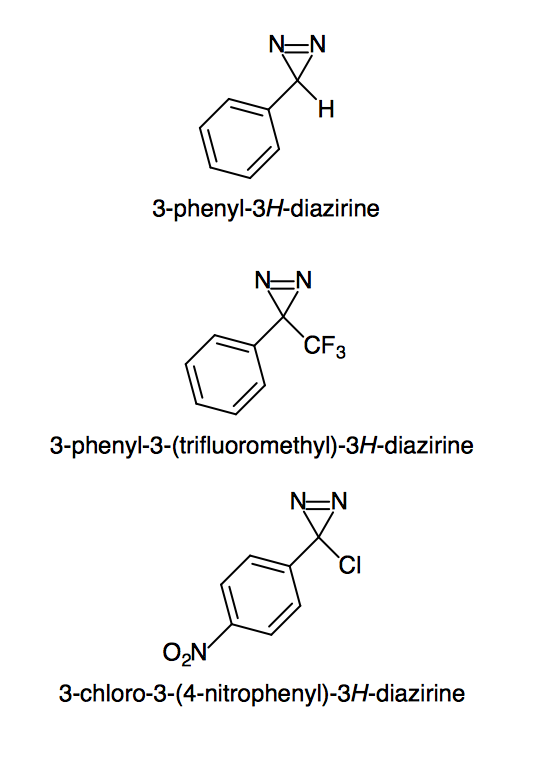
Three diazirines are shown above. Phenyldiazirine produces the singlet carbene whereas trifluoromethylphenyldiazirine and 3-chloro-3-[(4-nitrophenyl)methyl]diazirine produce triplet state carbenes.

Carbenes produced from diazirines are quickly quenched by reaction with water molecules, and hence yields for photoreactive crosslinking assays are often low. Yet, as this feature minimizes unspecific labeling, it is actually an advantage of using diazirines.

== Use in photoreactive crosslinking ==
Diazirines are often used as photoreactive crosslinking reagents, as the reactive carbenes they form upon irradiation with UV light can insert into C-H, N-H, and O-H bonds. This results in proximity-dependent labeling of other species with the diazirine containing compound. However, studies have found that diazirines have some pH dependence in labeling preferences, favoring acidic residues such as glutamate. Diazirine variants have been developed to reduce this bias.

Diazirines are often preferred to other photoreactive crosslinking reagents due to their smaller size, longer irradiation wavelength, short period of irradiation required, and stability in the presence of various nucleophiles, and in both acidic and basic conditions. Benzophenones, which form reactive triplet carbonyl species upon irradiation, often require long periods of irradiation which can result in non-specific labeling, and moreover are often inert to various polar solvents. Aryl azides require a low wavelength of irradiation, which can damage the biological macromolecules under investigation.

=== Examples in receptor labeling studies ===
Diazirines are widely used in receptor labeling studies. This is because diazirine-containing analogs of various ligands can be synthesized and incubated with their respective receptors, and then subsequently exposed to light to produce reactive carbenes. The carbene will covalently bond to residues in the binding site of the receptor. The carbene compound may include a bioorthogonal tag or handle by which the protein of interest can be isolated. The protein can then be digested and sequenced by mass spectrometry in order to identify which residues the carbene containing ligand is bound to, and hence the identity of the binding site in the receptor.

Examples of diazirines used in receptor labeling studies include:

- The discovery of a brassinosteroid receptor for brassinosteroid plant hormones by Kinoshita et al. Researchers used a plant hormone analog with a diazirine crosslinking moiety and a biotin tag for isolation to identify the new receptor. This study led to a number of similar studies conducted with regards to other plant hormones.

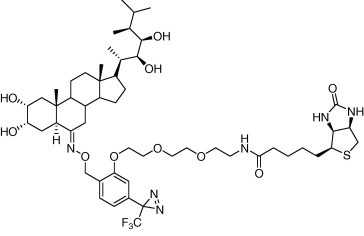

- The discovery of novel non-CB1/CB2 cannabinoid receptors using anandamide analog probes containing a diazirine group by Balas et al.
- The binding cavity of the hypnotic agent propofol in the GABA_{A} receptor using a diazirine containing propofol analog.
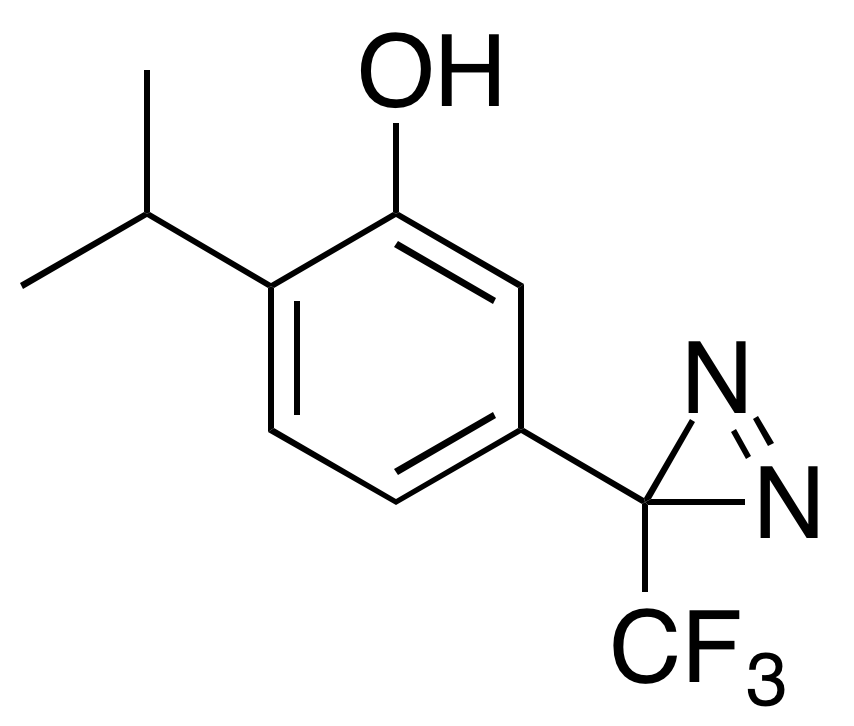
Propofol (left) and m-azipropofol, a diazirine analog of it

=== Examples in enzyme-substrate studies ===
In a manner analogous to receptor labeling, diazirine containing compounds that are analogs of natural substrates have also been used to identify binding pockets of enzymes. Examples include:

- The synthesis of a diazirine containing analog of etoposide, a widely used cancer drug targeting topoisomerase II, which holds promise for the identification of the etoposide binding site.
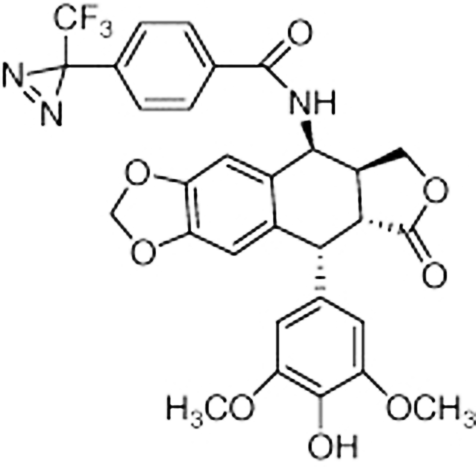
- The discovery that caprolactam-type gamma-secretase inhibitors target the SPP subunit of the gamma-secretase, which has been implicated in Alzheimer's disease.
- The finding that the O-GlcNAc post-translational modification mediates protein-protein interactions such as with 14-3-3 proteins.

=== Examples in nucleic acid studies ===
Diazirines have been used in photoaffinity labeling experiments involving nucleic acids as well. Examples include:

- Incorporation of a diazirine moiety on a nucleoside sugar in a DNA polymer to investigate interactions between the minor groove of DNA and DNA polymerases.

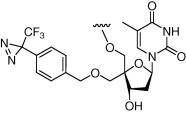

- Incorporation of a diazirine moiety on a nucleoside base in a DNA polymer to investigate the mode of DNA repair by proteins.
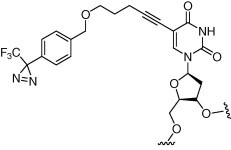

Diazirines have also been used to study protein lipid interactions, for example the interaction of various sphingolipids with proteins in vivo.
