= Nor- =

Prefix used in chemistry

In chemical nomenclature, nor- is a prefix to name a structural analog that can be derived from a parent compound by the removal of one carbon atom along with the accompanying hydrogen atoms. The nor-compound can be derived by removal of a CH_{3}, CH_{2}, or CH group, or of a C atom. The "nor-" prefix also includes the elimination of a methylene bridge in a cyclic parent compound, followed by ring contraction. (The prefix "homo-" which indicates the next higher member in a homologous series, is usually limited to noncyclic carbons). The terms desmethyl- or demethyl- are synonyms of "nor-".

"Nor" is an abbreviation of normal. Originally, the term was used to denote the completely demethylated form of the parent compound. Later, the meaning was restricted to the removal of one group. Nor is written directly in front of the stem name, without a hyphen between, unless there is another prefix after nor (for example α-). If multiple groups are eliminated the prefix dinor, trinor, tetranor, etcetera is used. The prefix is preceded by the position number (locant) of the carbon atoms that disappear (for example 2,3-dinor). The original numbering of the parent compound is retained. According to IUPAC nomenclature, this prefix is nor written with italic letters and unlike nor, when it is a di or higher nor, at the end of the numbers separated by commas, a hyphen is used (as for example 2,3-dinor-6-keto Prostaglandin F1α is produced by beta oxidation of the parent compound 6-keto Prostaglandin F1α). Here, though, carbon 1 and 2 are lost by oxidation. The new carbon 1 has now become a CCOH similar to the parent compound, looking as if just carbon 2 and 3 have been removed from the parent compound. "Dinor" does not have to be reduction in adjacent carbons, e.g. 5-Acetyl-4,18-dinor-retinoic acid, where 4 referred to a ring carbon and 18 referred to a methyl group on the 5th carbon on the ring.

The alternative use of "nor" in naming the unbranched form of a compound within a series of isomers (also referred to as "normal") is obsolete and not allowed in IUPAC names.

== History ==
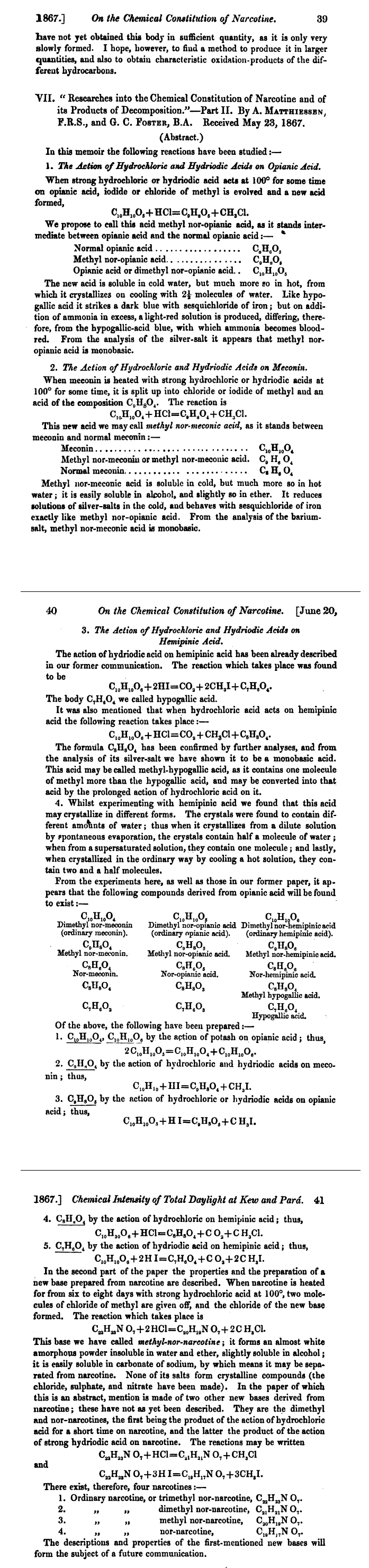
1867 publication about nor-compounds

Perhaps the earliest known use of the prefix "nor" is that by A. Matthiessen and G.C. Foster in 1867 in a publication about the reaction between a strong acid and opianic acid (see image). Opianic acid (C_{10}H_{10}O_{5}) is a compound with two methyl groups — in the publication in question the authors called it "dimethyl nor-opianic acid". After reaction with a strong acid a compound was attained with only one methyl (C_{9}H_{8}O_{5}). This partially demethylated opianic acid they called "methyl normal opianic acid". The completely demethylated compound (C_{8}H_{6}O_{5}) was denoted by the term "normal opianic acid", abbreviated as "nor-opianic acid".

Opianic acid demethylation

Similarly Matthiessen and Foster called narcotine, which has three methoxy groups, "trimethyl nor-narcotine". The singular demethylated narcotine was called "dimethyl nor-narcotine", the more demethylated narcotine "methyl nor-narcotine" and the completely demethylated form "normal narcotine" or "nor-narcotine".

"Since that time the meaning of the prefix has been generalized to denote the replacement of one or more methyl groups by H, or the disappearance of CH_{2} from a carbon chain".

At present, the meaning is restricted to denote the removal of only one group from the parent structure, rather than the completely demethylated form of the parent compound.

In literature, "nor" is sometimes called the "next lower homologue", although in this context "homologue" is an inexact term. "Nor" only refers to the removal of one carbon atom with the accompanying hydrogen, not the removal of other units. "Nor" compares two related compounds; it does not describe the relation to a homologous series.

=== False etymology ===
It is suggested that "nor" is an acronym of German "N ohne Radikal" ("nitrogen without radical"). At first, the British pharmacologist John H. Gaddum followed this theory, but in response to a review of A.M. Woolman, Gaddum retracted his support for this etymology. Woolman believed that "N ohne Radikal" was a German mnemonic and likely a backronym, rather than the real meaning of the prefix "nor". This can be argued with the fact "that the prefix nor is used for many compounds which contain no nitrogen at all".

== Obsolete use of the term ==
Originally, "nor" had an ambiguous meaning, as the term "normal" could also refer to the unbranched form in a series of isomers, for example as with alkanes, alkanols and some amino acids.

Names of unbranched alkanes and alkanols, like "normal butane" and "normal propyl alcohol", which are obsolete now, have become the prefix n-, however, not "nor". Other "normal" compounds got the prefix "nor". The IUPAC encourages that older trivial names, like norleucine and norvaline, not be used; the use of the prefix for isomeric compounds was already discouraged in 1955 or earlier.

Removal of atoms from rings: cyclopamine, an example of a complex C-nor-D-homosteroid, where the C-12 atom is removed from the normally 6-membered central steroid ring (C-ring) and migrated into the normally 5-membered adjacent D-ring, during the course of biosynthesis, so swapping these ring sizes and markedly changing bioactivity. (As "nor-" indicates removal, "homo" indicates homologation (addition) of the removed carbon to other ring.) The cyclopamine steroid natural product is responsible for cyclopia in lambs whose mothers ingest it in corn lily.

== Examples ==
epinephrine	norepinephrine
testosterone	nortestosterone

== See also ==
- Norsteroid
