= DCL5 =

Plant gene encoding a Dicer-like protein

Endoribonuclease Dicer-like 5 (DCL5)

Identifiers
- Organism: Zea mays
- Symbol: DCL5
- Alt. symbols: Zm00001eb045380

Other data
- EC number: EC:3.1.26.3

DICER-LIKE 5 (DCL5) is a plant Dicer-like endoribonuclease that functions in the biogenesis of 24-nucleotide reproductive phased small interfering RNAs (phasiRNAs). The gene is specific to monocots and plays a central role during early anther development, where these small RNAs accumulate at high levels.

DCL5 originated through duplication and functional specialization of DCL3, giving rise to a distinct small RNA pathway associated with plant reproduction.

== Evolution ==
Phylogenetic analyses indicate that DCL5 arose early in monocot evolution, likely before the diversification of grasses, and is absent from most eudicots. Comparative genomics further places the origin of DCL5 at or before early-diverging monocots such as Acorus americanus, suggesting an ancient duplication event followed by lineage-specific retention.

This duplication led to functional divergence between DCL3 and DCL5, with DCL3 primarily associated with heterochromatic siRNA pathways and DCL5 specialized for reproductive phasiRNA production in monocots.

The diversification of DCL5 parallels the expansion and diversification of reproductive phasiRNA loci in monocots, indicating co-evolution of this enzyme with its small RNA substrates.

== Function ==
DCL5 processes precursor transcripts into 24-nucleotide reproductive phasiRNAs that accumulate during premeiotic and meiotic stages of anther development. DCL5 specifically mediates the biogenesis of reproductive phasiRNAs, a subclass of phased small interfering RNAs enriched in premeiotic and meiotic anthers.

These small RNAs are derived from PHAS precursor transcripts that are converted into double-stranded RNA and then processed into phased small interfering RNAs by DCL5. In some nongrass monocots, many 24-nt reproductive phasiRNA precursors are predicted to form foldback or intramolecular duplex structures, indicating that DCL5-associated 24-nt reproductive phasiRNA biogenesis can proceed through more than one precursor structure or biogenesis pathway. In the canonical pathway, meiotic 24-nt reproductive phasiRNAs are triggered by the microRNA miR2275, which directs phased processing of precursor transcripts.

Genetic and molecular studies in rice initially identified this monocot-specific Dicer protein (DCL3b, later renamed DCL5) responsible for 24-nt phasiRNA production, distinct from DCL4, which generates 21-nt phasiRNAs.

Unlike DCL3, which processes RNA polymerase IV-derived transcripts, DCL5 acts primarily on transcripts generated by RNA polymerase II, reflecting mechanistic divergence between these pathways.

== Role in plant reproduction ==
DCL5 is essential for normal male reproductive development in grasses. Loss-of-function mutations in DCL5 lead to depletion of 24-nt reproductive phasiRNAs and defects in pollen development. In maize and wheat, dcl5 mutants exhibit temperature-sensitive male sterility, indicating that the DCL5 pathway contributes to fertility under specific environmental conditions.

Recent work suggests that some 24-nt reproductive phasiRNA biogenesis can occur independently of microRNA-directed cleavage and instead may involve conserved sequence motifs that guide DCL5-associated processing.

These findings support a model in which DCL5-dependent phasiRNAs contribute to transcriptional regulation and developmental robustness during male gametophyte formation.

== See also ==
- Dicer
- DCL1
- DCL2
- DCL3
- DCL4
- phasiRNA
