= Mir-194 microRNA precursor family =

mir-194 microRNA precursor family
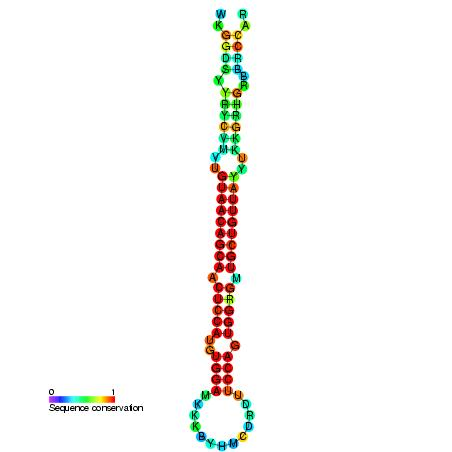
- Predicted secondary structure and sequence conservation of mir-194

Identifiers
- Symbol: mir-194
- Rfam: RF00257
- miRBase: MI0000488
- miRBase family: MIPF0000055

Other data
- RNA type: Gene; miRNA
- Domain(s): Eukaryota
- GO: GO:0035195 GO:0035068
- SO: SO:0001244
- PDB structures: PDBe

In molecular biology, miR-194 microRNA precursor is a small non-coding RNA gene that regulated gene expression. Its expression has been verified in mouse (MI0000236, MI0000733) and in human (MI0000488, MI0000732). mir-194 appears to be a vertebrate-specific miRNA and has now been predicted or experimentally confirmed in a range of vertebrate species (MIPF0000055). The mature microRNA is processed from the longer hairpin precursor by the Dicer enzyme. In this case, the mature sequence is excised from the 5' arm of the hairpin.

== See also ==
- MIR194-1
