= DCL1 =

Protein coding gene in plants

Endoribonuclease Dicer-like 1
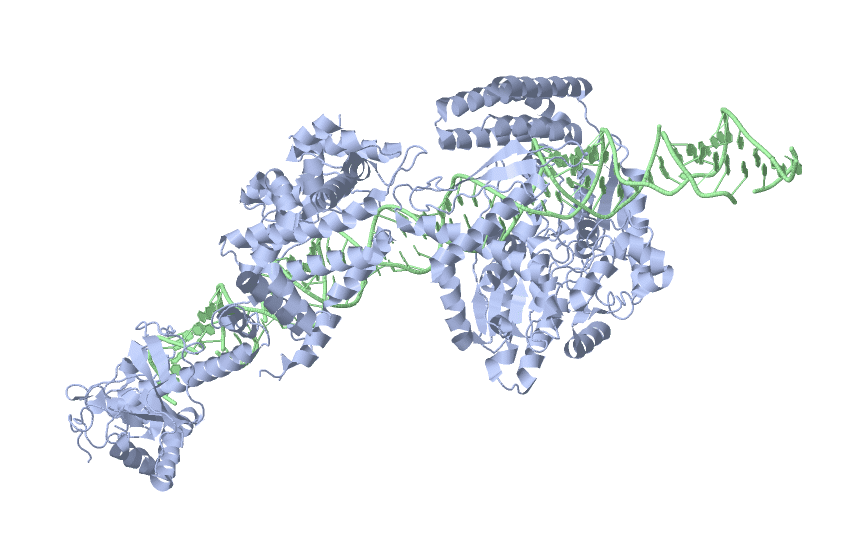
- Cartoon representation of Arabidopsis DCL1 in complex with pri-miRNA 166f. Single chain of DCL1 in light purple catalyzing the cleavage of pri-miRNA-166f into pre-miRNA-166f, before one more cleavage step to finally release miRNA-166f.

Identifiers
- Organism: Arabidopsis thaliana
- Symbol: DCL1
- Alt. symbols: AT1G01040
- Orthologs: OMA: entry
- PDB: 7ELD
- UniProt: Q9SP32

Other data
- EC number: EC:3.1.26
- Chromosome: 1: 0.02 - 0.03 Mb
Search for
- Structures: Swiss-model
- Domains: InterPro

DCL1 (an abbreviation of Dicer-like 1) is a gene in plants that codes for the DCL1 protein, a ribonuclease III enzyme involved in processing double-stranded RNA (dsRNA) and microRNA (miRNA). Although DCL1, also called Endoribonuclease Dicer homolog 1, is named for its homology with the metazoan protein Dicer, its role in miRNA biogenesis is somewhat different, due to substantial differences in miRNA maturation processes between plants and animals, as well due to additional downstream plant-specific pathways, where DCL1 paralogs like DCL4 participate, such trans-acting siRNA biogenesis.

== Function ==
DCL1 is localized exclusively in the plant cell nucleus, together with the double-stranded RNA binding protein Hyponastic Leaves1 (HYL1), CTD-Phosphatase-Like1 (CPL1) and the zinc finger protein SERRATE (SE), form nuclear dicing bodies or D-bodies. In these membraneless organelles, pri-miRNAs are recognized and processes into pre-miRNAs and subsequently into mature miRNA duplexes, by the binding of additional proteins such as Constitutive Alterations in the Small RNAs Pathways9 (CARP9). In plants, DCL1 is responsible both for processing a primary miRNA to a pre-miRNA, and for then processing the pre-miRNA to a mature miRNA. In animals, the equivalents of these two steps are carried out by different proteins; First, pri-miRNA processing takes place in the nucleus by the ribonuclease Drosha as part of the Microprocessor complex. Second and finally processing to a mature miRNA takes place in the cytoplasm by Dicer to yield a mature miRNA.

== PAZ domain plasticity ==
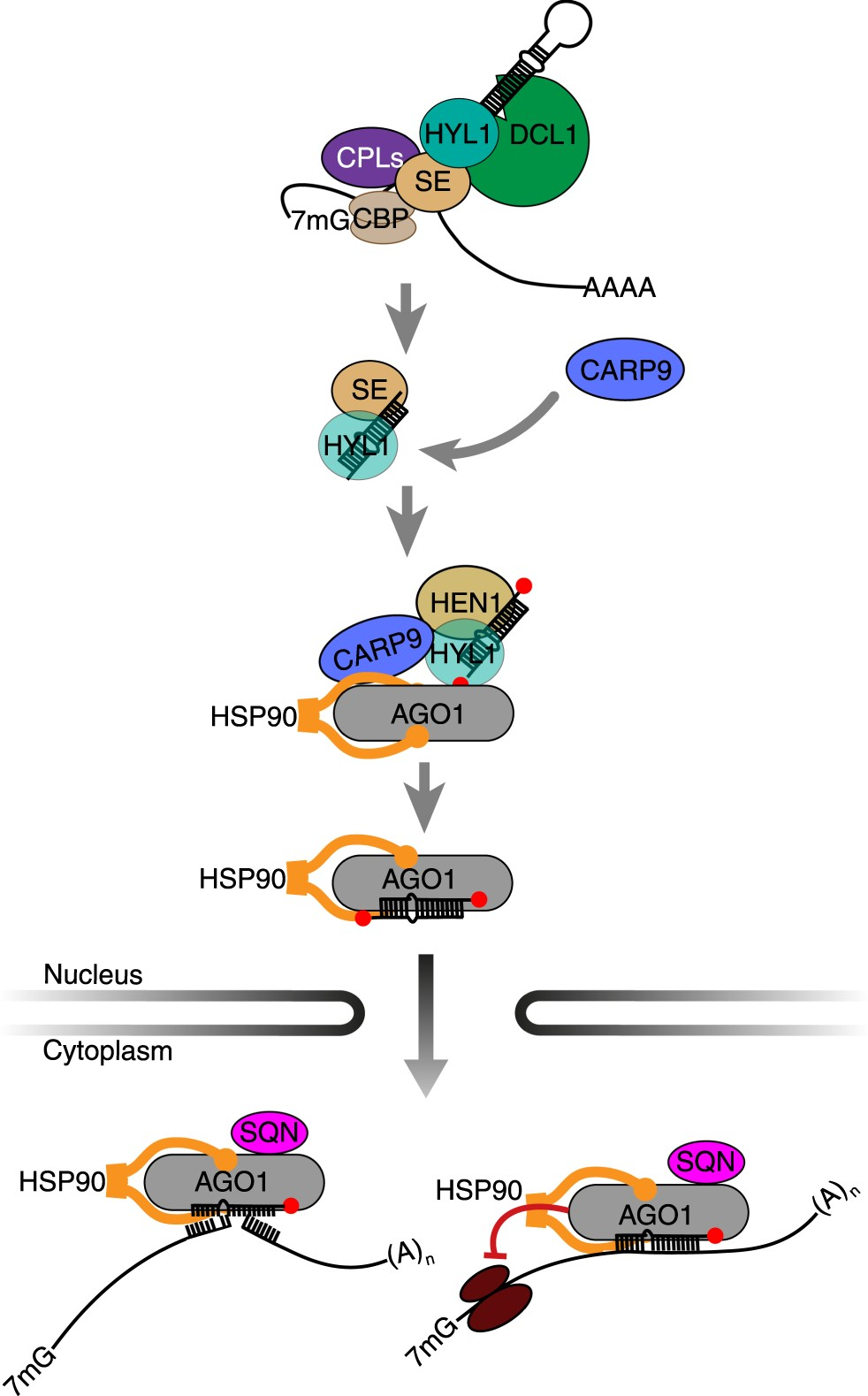
A model for DCL1-HYL-SE scaffolding for the pri-miRNA to pre-miRNA maturation process, as well for the pre-miRNA to miRNA maturation step helped by CARP9 binding into the DICER-Complex

In animals, hairpin-containing primary transcripts (pri-miRNAs) are cleaved by Drosha to generate precursor-miRNAs, a double strand palindromic structure typically call hairpin pre-miRNAs, which are subsequently cleaved by Dicer to generate mature miRNAs. Instead of being cleaved by two different enzymes, both cleavages in plants are performed by Dicer-like 1 (DCL1), despite a similar domain architecture between both homologous enzymes. Recent single-particle cryo-electron microscopy structures of both complexes of dsRNA structures (pri-RNA and pre-miRNA) as ligand of Arabidopsis DCL1, in cleavage-competent state, suggest that PAZ domain plasticity allow its to get involved in pri-miRNA and pre-miRNA recognition, the possibility of an internal loop binding groove of this protein domain, which serves as an engine that transfers the substrate between two sequential cleavage events.

== Other Dicer-like proteins in plants ==
Although DCL1 is responsible for the majority of the miRNA processing in plants, most plants contain an additional set of DCLs proteins with related roles in RNA processing, the number of additional members of the same family depends on the plant family. For instance, in Brassicaceae there are five additional genes paralogous to DCL1, including DCL2, DCL3, DCL4 and two RNASE III-LIKE genes RTL1 and RTL2; However, some plant genomes encode additional DCL paralogs, such as Populus trichocarpa or rice in which DCL2 was duplicated. Most monocot genomes encode an additional Dicer, known as DCL5 and derived from an ancestral monocot-specific DCL3 duplication that yielded the genes known as DCL3a and DCL3b, subsequently renamed as DCL3 and DCL5 respectively.
