= DCL2 =

Dicer-like gene in plants

Endoribonuclease Dicer homolog 2
- Cartoon representation of Arabidopsis DCL2, Based on computational predictions using Alphafold2 and rendered with open software Mol Star * (https://alphafold.ebi.ac.uk/entry/Q3EBC8, https://molstar.org/viewer/)

Identifiers
- Organism: Arabidopsis thaliana
- Symbol: DCL2
- Alt. symbols: AT3G03300
- Orthologs: OMA: entry
- UniProt: Q3EBC8
Search for
- Structures: Swiss-model
- Domains: InterPro

DCL2 (an abbreviation of Dicer-like 2) is a gene in plants that codes for the DCL2 protein, a ribonuclease III enzyme involved in processing exogenous double-stranded RNA (dsRNA) into 22 nucleotide small interference RNAs (siRNAs).

Diverse sources of dsRNAs have been characterized, broadly classified as exogenous or endogenous. A classical example of exogenous derived dsRNAs are the viral genomes release during infection, specially from those double-stranded RNA viruses, where the cleavage of dsRNA produce small RNA products called viral siRNAs or vsi-RNAs. Other examples of exogenous source of dsRNAs are transgenic with several insertion loci along the plant hos genome. DCL2 also process endogenous sources as double-stranded RNAs derived of cis-natural antisense transcripts, generating 22nt short interfering RNA (natsi-RNAs); however, the biological relevance, evolutionary conservation, and experimental validation of natsi-RNAs remains controversial.

== Function ==
Dicer proteins belongs to the RNaseIII-like family, a gene family with highly conserved endonuclease in eukaryotes, with procaryotes representatives. In Arabidopsis and most of land Plants, there are mainly four Dicer-like proteins (DCL): DCL1, DCL2, DCL3, and DCL4. They all contain five domains, following the order from N-terminus to C-terminus: DEXD-helicase, helicase-C, domain of unknown function 283 (DUF283), Piwi/Argonaute/Zwille (PAZ) domain, two tandem RNase III domains, and one or two dsRNA-binding domains (dsRBDs). In general, the helicase domain of dicer-like proteins utilizes ATP hydrolysis to facilitate the unwinding of dsRNA. The DUF283 domain have been recently associated as a protein domain involve in facilitation of RNA-RNA base pairing and RNA-binding. The PAZ and RNase III domains are essential for dsRNA cleavage via the recognition of dsRNA ends by PAZ domain, the RNase III domains cuts one of the strands of dsRNA.

DCL2 plays an essential role in transitive silencing of transgenes by processing secondary siRNAs, including trans-acting siRNA. To do so, it does requires DCL4 and RDR6, which amplifies the silencing by using the mRNA target of the DCL2's generated 22nt siRNA, as substrate to generate secondary siRNAs, providing an efficient mechanism for long-distance silencing, in a phenomenon called transitivity of RNA silencing.

DCL2 may participate as well with DCL3 in the production of 24 nucleotide repeat-associated siRNAs (ra-siRNAs) derived from heterochromatic regions, genomic regions silenced by the presence of DNA repetitive elements such as transposons.

== Transitive and systemic RNA silencing ==
A key difference between DCL1 and others DCLs 2,3 and 4 proteins is the amplification capacity of the pathways specific for the later protein. The involvement of RDR proteins extends the small RNA-target complex beyond the original trigger-spot. The subset of siRNA used in signal amplification are called transitive or secondary siRNAs and the process of amplification is called transitivity. The amplification propagates the secondary siRNA and its target specific silencing activity from one tissue to another, eventually reaching the whole plant's tissues, in a process called systemic silencing.
