= RNA polymerase V =

Multisubunit plant specific RNA polymerase

RNA polymerase V (Pol V), previously known as RNA polymerase IVb, is a multisubunit plant specific RNA polymerase. It is required for normal function and biogenesis of small interfering RNA (siRNA). Together with RNA polymerase IV (Pol IV), Pol V is involved in an siRNA-dependent epigenetic pathway known as RNA-directed DNA methylation (RdDM), which establishes and maintains heterochromatic silencing in plants.

== Structure ==
RNA polymerase V is composed of 12 subunits that are paralogous to RNA polymerase II (Pol II) subunits. Approximately half of these subunits are shared among Pol II, IV, and V. Its two largest subunits, together forming the catalytic site, make up the most conserved region sharing similarity with eukaryotic and bacterial polymerases. The subunits unique to only Pol IV and V are believed to have arisen from gene duplication events that occurred prior to the evolution of land plants. The structure of Pol V has been studied in a variety of plants, including Arabidopsis thaliana, maize, and cauliflower. Affinity purification has shown significant differences in Pol V composition among these different species.

In Arabidopsis, the largest subunit is known as NRPE1. This subunit contains a GW-rich AGO-hook motif that provides the ability to interact with the argonaute protein AGO4, as well as targeting of DNA methylation. While the subunit is unique to Pol V, it does contain a conserved domain common with the largest subunit of Pol IV known as Defective Chloroplasts and Leaves (DeCL), which provides an unknown function. The second largest subunit of Pol V, NRPD/E2, is shared with Pol IV. Aside from its catalytic site, Arabidopsis Pol V contains 10 smaller, noncatalytic subunits. Of these, 6 are shared with Pol II and 8 are shared with Pol IV. The fourth and seventh subunits form what is known as the "Stalk" subcomplex, while the fifth and ninth subunits form the "Jaw" subcomplex.

== Function ==
Pol V transcribes one of the two types of non-coding RNA involved in RdDM. In canonical RdDM, Pol V transcribes a scaffold RNA which base pairs with a 24-nt siRNA bound to AGO4. The AGO-hook motif in Pol V's largest subunit recruits this AGO4 to the site. Pol V transcripts are also necessary for the recruitment of chromatin remodelers to the target site. One such protein is Domains Rearranged Methyltransferase 2 (DRM2), which is believed to be recruited when the AGO4-bound siRNA base pairs with the scaffold. Once proteins are bound to this scaffold RNA, histone modification and DNA methylation may proceed.
