= DCL3 =

Plant gene

Endoribonuclease Dicer homolog 3
- Cartoon representation of Arabidopsis DCL3 (red) in complex with 41nt TAS1a reverse strand (blue), based on atomic coordinates of PDB 7VG2 (Wang Q. et al 2021), rendered with open software Mol Star.

Identifiers
- Organism: Arabidopsis thaliana
- Symbol: DCL3
- Alt. symbols: AT3G43920
- Orthologs: OMA: entry
- UniProt: Q9LXW7
Search for
- Structures: Swiss-model
- Domains: InterPro

DCL3 (Dicer-like 3) is a plant gene that encodes a ribonuclease III enzyme involved in the RNA-directed DNA methylation (RdDM) pathway, a plant-specific mechanism of transcriptional gene silencing. DCL3 processes double-stranded RNA (dsRNA) precursors into 24-nucleotide small interfering RNAs (siRNAs) that guide epigenetic modification of target genomic loci.

DCL3 is one of several Dicer-like (DCL) proteins encoded in plant genomes. Unlike DCL1, which primarily generates microRNAs, and DCL4, which produces 21-nucleotide siRNAs, DCL3 is specialized for the biogenesis of 24-nucleotide siRNAs that function in heterochromatic silencing and transposon repression.

== Function ==
In plants, the RNA-directed DNA methylation (RdDM) pathway mediates transcriptional silencing of repetitive elements and transposable elements through small RNA–guided epigenetic modification. DCL3 plays a central role in this pathway by generating 24-nucleotide siRNAs from endogenous dsRNA substrates.

These dsRNA precursors are derived primarily from transcripts produced by RNA polymerase IV at heterochromatic loci. The single-stranded RNA products of Pol IV are converted into double-stranded RNA by RNA-dependent RNA polymerase 2 (RDR2). DCL3 then cleaves these dsRNA molecules into 24-nt siRNAs.

The resulting siRNAs are incorporated into the Argonaute 4 (AGO4) protein. AGO4-associated siRNAs base-pair with scaffold transcripts generated by RNA polymerase V, facilitating recruitment of domains-rearranged methylase 2 (DRM2). This process results in cytosine DNA methylation and transcriptional repression of the target locus.

== Evolutionary history ==
DCL3 arose as a specialized paralog within the plant Dicer-like (DCL) gene family during early land plant evolution. Phylogenetic analyses indicate that DCL3 is present in bryophytes and vascular plants, consistent with the early establishment of RNA-directed DNA methylation (RdDM) pathways in terrestrial plant lineages. In contrast to animal Dicer proteins, which primarily generate microRNAs and siRNAs involved in post-transcriptional regulation, plant DCL3 became functionally specialized for the production of 24-nucleotide siRNAs associated with transcriptional gene silencing and heterochromatin formation.

The emergence of DCL3 coincided with the evolution of plant-specific RNA polymerases, including RNA polymerase IV and RNA polymerase V, which are central to the RdDM pathway. This coordinated expansion of silencing machinery enabled plants to establish robust epigenetic regulation of transposable elements and repetitive DNA. Comparative genomic studies suggest that the 24-nucleotide siRNA pathway is broadly conserved across land plants, reflecting an early and stable integration of DCL3-mediated silencing into plant genome defense and epigenetic regulation systems.
