= DCL4 =

Plant gene encoding a Dicer-like protein

Endoribonuclease Dicer-like 4 (DCL4)
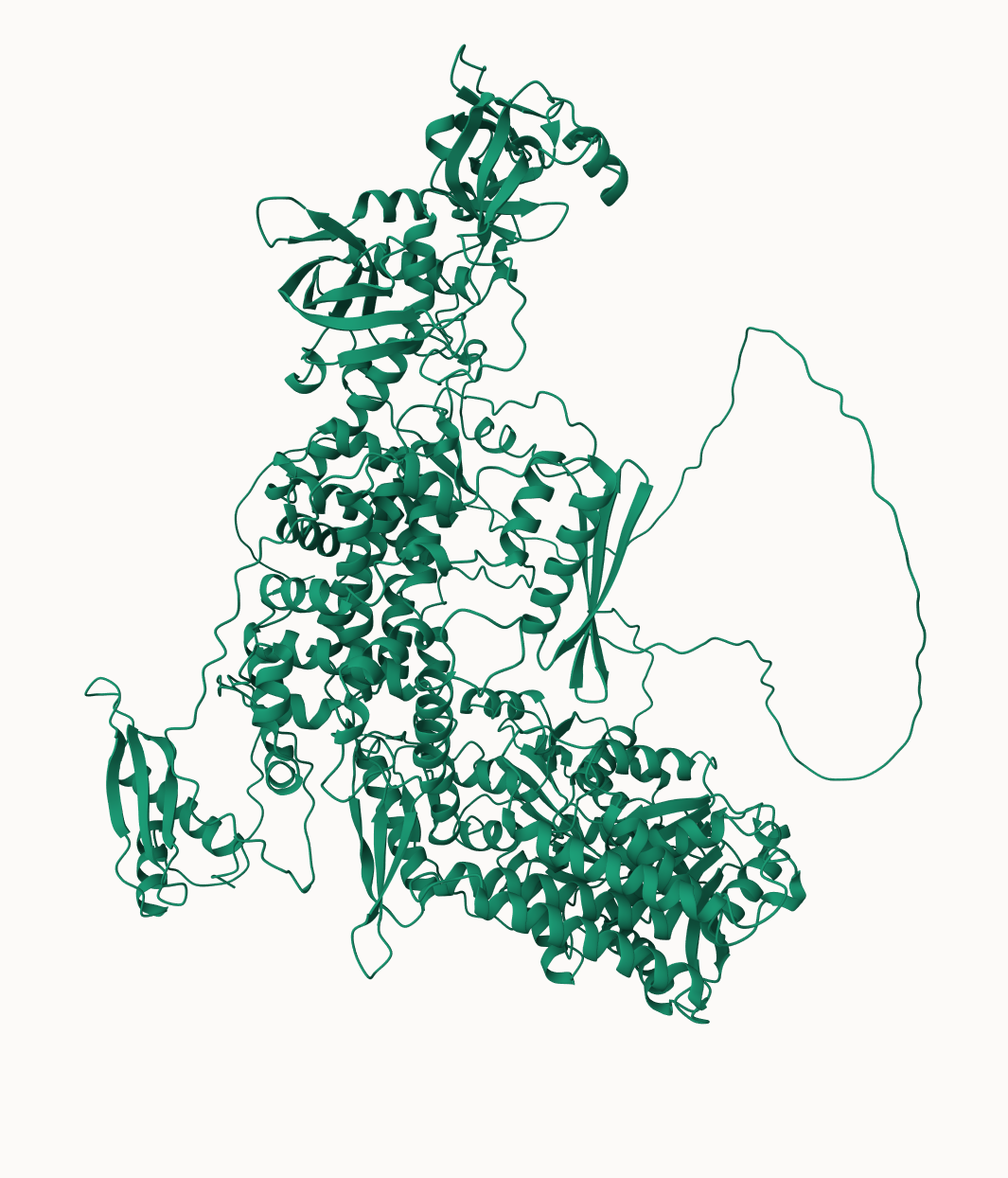
- Predicted structure of Arabidopsis thaliana DCL4 generated by AlphaFold.

Identifiers
- Organism: Arabidopsis thaliana
- Symbol: DCL4
- Alt. symbols: AT5G20320
- Orthologs: OMA: entry
- PDB: 2KOU
- UniProt: P84634

Other data
- EC number: EC:3.1.26.3
- Chromosome: 5: 6.86 - 6.87 Mb
Search for
- Structures: Swiss-model
- Domains: InterPro

DCL4 (Dicer-like 4) is a plant gene that encodes an enzyme involved in RNA silencing, a process by which cells regulate gene expression and defend against viruses. In flowering plants, DCL4 produces a specific class of small regulatory RNAs that help control development and protect against viral infection.

DCL4 encodes a ribonuclease III enzyme that processes double-stranded RNA (dsRNA) into 21-nucleotide small interfering RNAs (siRNAs). DCL4 is one of several Dicer-like (DCL) proteins encoded by plant genomes, with most eudicots having four major DCLs and many monocots encoding a fifth additional paralog. DCL4 plays a central role in post-transcriptional gene silencing pathways, particularly in the biogenesis of trans-acting siRNAs (ta-siRNAs) and phased siRNAs (phasiRNAs).

The gene was first identified in Arabidopsis due to the mutant phenotype and the role of ta-siRNAs in vegetative phase change in Arabidopsis. DCL4 functions together with the double-stranded RNA (dsRNA) binding protein DRB4 to process substrate double-stranded RNA. Although DCL4 is homologous to the metazoan Dicer protein, its biological functions are specialized within plant small RNA pathways and are distinct from those of DCL1, which primarily mediates microRNA (miRNA) maturation. DCL4 activity is also a key component of antiviral defense in plants, where it processes viral dsRNA into siRNAs that guide RNA silencing responses.

== Function ==
In plants, dsRNA precursors are processed by distinct Dicer-like enzymes that generate small interfering RNAs of characteristic lengths. DCL4 primarily produces 21-nucleotide siRNAs. A subset of endogenous siRNAs known as ta-siRNAs generated by DCL4 functions analogously to microRNAs by regulating gene expression at distant genomic loci. Formation of ta-siRNAs is initiated by microRNA-mediated cleavage of noncoding TAS transcripts, followed by RNA-dependent RNA polymerase 6 (RDR6)–dependent synthesis of dsRNA, which serves as the substrate for DCL4 processing.

DCL4 is the principal Dicer-like enzyme responsible for the phased processing of TAS3 transcripts into 21-nucleotide trans-acting siRNAs. Following miR390-guided cleavage of the TAS3 long noncoding RNA and conversion of the cleavage products into double-stranded RNA by RNA-dependent RNA polymerase 6 (RDR6), DCL4 generates regularly phased siRNAs that regulate AUXIN RESPONSE FACTOR (ARF) genes.

In Arabidopsis thaliana, DCL4 shows partial functional redundancy with DCL2. DCL4 is the primary enzyme responsible for generating 21-nucleotide small interfering RNAs involved in post-transcriptional gene silencing, whereas DCL2 can act as a backup pathway, producing 22-nucleotide siRNAs when DCL4 activity is reduced or absent.

In rice (Oryza sativa), DCL4 plays an essential role in small RNA–mediated regulation of plant development. Genetic disruption or knockdown of OsDCL4 results in pleiotropic developmental defects, including abnormalities in vegetative growth and severe alterations in spikelet identity, indicating a broad requirement for DCL4-dependent siRNA pathways during monocot development. These phenotypes differ markedly from those observed in Arabidopsis dcl4 mutants, suggesting that DCL4-mediated silencing has expanded or diverged functions in grasses. Molecular analyses show that OsDCL4 is the primary enzyme responsible for generating 21-nucleotide siRNAs from both endogenous loci and inverted-repeat substrates, including trans-acting siRNAs derived from TAS transcripts, linking its biochemical activity directly to developmental regulation in rice.

DCL4 is also a central component of the pathway that produces 21-nucleotide phased small interfering RNAs, including reproductive phasiRNAs, across the angiosperms. In rice, large numbers of phased siRNA loci are initiated by miRNA-directed cleavage and subsequently processed by OsDCL4 into regularly spaced 21-nucleotide products. These phased siRNAs are highly enriched in male reproductive tissues, particularly developing anthers, and represent one of the most abundant classes of DCL4-dependent small RNAs in monocots.

== Evolutionary history ==
DCL4 arose early in the evolution of land plants as a specialized paralog within the plant Dicer-like (DCL) gene family. Phylogenetic analyses indicate that DCL4 emerged through gene duplication following the divergence of plants from other eukaryotic lineages, with clear orthologs present in bryophytes and vascular plants but absent from algae and non-plant eukaryotes. This diversification accompanied the expansion of RNA-dependent RNA polymerase–based silencing pathways in plants, enabling the production of 21-nucleotide small interfering RNAs from dsRNA substrates.

Over evolutionary time, DCL4 became functionally specialized for phased and trans-acting siRNA biogenesis and antiviral defense, roles that distinguish it from other plant DCL paralogs such as DCL1 and DCL3. Comparative genomic analyses show that TAS3 is conserved across all major land plant lineages, including bryophytes, indicating that the DCL4-dependent TAS3 pathway arose early during terrestrial plant evolution. This exceptional conservation makes TAS3 one of the oldest known plant long noncoding RNAs and therefore DCL4 is a core component of an ancient regulatory circuit linking small RNAs to developmental patterning.
