= Trans-acting siRNA =

Class of small interfering RNA

Trans-acting siRNA (abbreviated "ta-siRNA" or "tasiRNA") are a class of small interfering RNA (siRNA) that repress gene expression through post-transcriptional gene silencing in land plants. TasiRNAs are a functionally defined subset of phased small interfering RNAs (phasiRNAs): they are produced in a phased pattern from TAS precursor transcripts and have experimentally demonstrated activity in trans, targeting transcripts distinct from the loci from which they are produced. The broader term phasiRNA includes phased siRNAs whether or not trans-acting function has been demonstrated.

Precursor transcripts from TAS loci are generally noncoding and polyadenylated. Following microRNA-guided cleavage, they are converted to double-stranded RNA by an RNA-dependent RNA polymerase, and are then processed into 21-nucleotide-long RNA duplexes with overhangs, by DCL4. A subset of tasiRNA segments are incorporated into an RNA-induced silencing complex (RISC) and direct the sequence-specific cleavage of complementary target mRNA. Ta-siRNAs are classified as siRNAs because they arise from double-stranded RNA (dsRNA).

== Discovery ==
ta-siRNA were originally detected in 2004 in the flowering plant Arabidopsis thaliana. Initial descriptions found involvement of the plant protein suppressor of gene silencing 3 (SGS3), and the enzyme RNA-dependent RNA polymerase 6 (RDR6). The phased arrangement of tasiRNAs relative to a microRNA-guided cleavage site was demonstrated in 2005. The term phasiRNA was subsequently adopted for the broader class of phased secondary siRNAs, including those for which activity in trans has not been established.

== Biogenesis ==
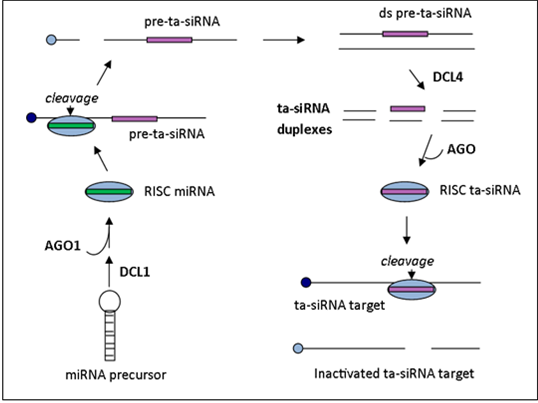
ta-siRNA Biogenesis in Arabidopsis.

Ta-siRNAs are generated from non-coding transcripts through Argonaute-mediated miRNA-guided cleavage followed by conversion to double stranded RNA by RDR6. The resulting dsRNA is further processed by the Dicer-like 4 (DCL4) enzyme to produce a phased array of 21-nt siRNAs from positions adjoining the miRNA cleavage site.

There are four families of ta-siRNA-generating loci (TAS genes) in A. thaliana. TAS1, TAS2, and TAS4 families require one miRNA binding site for cleavage to occur while TAS3 requires two binding sites. TAS gene family numbers do not generally indicate orthology, e.g. the moss TAS1 gene family does not share an ancestor gene with the Arabidopsis thaliana TAS1 gene family.

=== TAS1 and TAS2 ===
TAS1/2 transcripts undergo an initial AGO1 mediated cleavage at the 5' end that is guided by miR173. RDR6 then converts the transcript into a double strand RNA fragment which then gets processed by DCL4 to generate the 21-nt siRNA with 2 nucleotide 3' overhangs that target complementary mRNAs in trans.

=== TAS4 ===
The initial steps for the TAS4 family of ta-siRNA is similar to that of TAS1 and TAS2. The TAS4 family of transcripts first undergo miR828 guided, AGO1 mediated cleavage, followed by dsRNA synthesis and processing by DCL4.

=== TAS3 ===
In the canonical TAS3 pathway, the microRNA miR390 binds the precursor transcript at two sites. AGO7 cleaves the transcript at one of these sites, after which RDR6 and DCL4 generate phased tasiRNAs. The transcript is then cleaved at the 3' binding site only, by AGO7. As is the case for the TAS1, TAS2, and TAS3 families, RDR6 then synthesizes the dsRNA fragment which is further processed by DCL4. Outside of Arabidopsis, many variations on the structure of the TAS3 precursor and miR390 target sites have been observed.

== Mechanism ==
Endogenous ta-siRNAs act via hetero-silencing, which means that the genes they target for cleavage and repression do not have much resemblance to the genes from which the siRNAs derive. The designation trans-acting distinguishes tasiRNAs from small RNAs whose demonstrated targets are the same locus or closely related sequences from which they originate. Other siRNAs or phasiRNAs may also regulate targets in trans, but are generally called tasiRNAs only when such activity has been experimentally established. It was previously thought that only miRNAs exhibited hetero-silencing. Like other siRNAs, the ta-siRNAs are incorporated into RNA-induced silencing complexes (RISCs), where they guide the complex to cleave the target mRNAs in the middle of a single complementary site and repress translation.

A member of the Argonaute protein family is a component of all RNA silencing effector complexes, including the RISCs that catalyze mRNA cleavage. Specifically in arabidopsis, it appears to be AGO7/ZIPPY that plays a role in the ta-siRNA pathway by acting during TAS3-derived ta-siRNA-mediated regulation. AGO7/ZIPPY does not play a role in the mechanisms for TAS1 or TAS2 ta-siRNA biogenesis. ta-siRNAs can be loaded into AGO1 complexes to guide target mRNA cleavage.

== Presence in plants ==
In addition to A. thaliana, tasiRNAs have been identified in the moss Physcomitrella patens, maize, rice and many other plants. The miR390–TAS3 pathway is particularly ancient and conserved, with TAS3 loci and their derived tasiRNAs found across major lineages of land plants. TAS3-derived tasiRNAs known as tasiR-ARFs target transcripts encoding auxin response factor (ARF) proteins and thereby regulate auxin-responsive developmental pathways.
