= Double-stranded RNA =

Type of RNA

Double-stranded RNA structure

Double-stranded RNA (dsRNA) is RNA with two complementary strands found in cells. It is similar to DNA but with the replacement of thymine by uracil and the adding of one oxygen atom. Despite the structural similarities, much less is known about dsRNA.

They form the genetic material of some viruses (double-stranded RNA viruses). dsRNA, such as viral RNA or siRNA, can trigger RNA interference in eukaryotes, as well as interferon response in vertebrates. In eukaryotes, dsRNA plays a role in the activation of the innate immune system against viral infections.

== History of discovery ==
Watson and Crick had noted early on that the 2′ hydroxyl group on each RNA nucleotide would prevent RNA from forming a double helix similar to the one they had described for DNA.

In 1995, Alexander Rich and David R. Davies proposed the double helix structure of RNA for the first time.

== Structure ==
High molecular weight RNA in the 'A' form is referred to as dsRNA and possesses the following characteristics:

- A cooperative type of temperature transition profiles with ionic strength-dependent Tm values;
- Sedimentation coefficients (s_{20,w}) above 8–9 S;
- A base composition expected for an RNA duplex composed of two complementary, antiparallel strands stabilized by hydrogen bonds and hydrophobic interactions;
- A molar absorbance (per phosphodiester group) lower than that of single-stranded RNA (ssRNA);
- An absolute hypochromicity significantly more than ssRNA.

These characteristics are found in the genomes of various organisms, as well as in the double-stranded RNA that was formerly referred to as the "replicative form" and subsequently thought to be a byproduct of phage RNA replication. Alternatively, they are found in artificial high molecular weight double-stranded polyribonucleotide complexes like poly(A) · poly(U) or poly(I) · poly(C) complexes.

The widely recognized acidic forms of polyadenylate and polycytidylate can be introduced to these canonical double-stranded RNA species. Because the bases of these polyribonucleotides are protonated at pH values lower than adenine and cytosine's pK values, they assume a well-characterized [and for poly(A) particularly stable] double-stranded structure at acidic pH levels.

The more or less abundant self-complementary sequences found in all other forms of RNA, including rRNA, mRNA, tRNA, single-stranded viral RNA, and viroid RNA, can likewise form double-helical secondary structures, albeit incomplete and/or irregular.

== Sources ==
Endogenous retroviruses, natural sense-antisense transcript pairs, mitochondrial transcripts, and repetitive nuclear sequences, including short and long interspersed elements (SINEs and LINEs), are some of the primary sources of endogenous dsRNA.

== Properties ==
In general, dsRNAs share some significant characteristics:

- They show a remarkable resistance to RNase A.
- They are not transcribed from the DNA of the host genome.
- The majority of them are consistently present in the host at a low concentration.
- They do not appear to have a noticeable impact on the phenotype of their host.
- They are effectively carried to the next generation.

dsRNA range in size from 1.5 to 20 kbp. Smaller dsRNAs (<2.0 kbp) are frequently associated with virus-like particles, and some of these dsRNAs have already been identified as viruses belonging to the Partitiviridae family. They typically have two distinct linear dsRNA segments, each approximately 2.0 kbp in length. Segments larger than 10 kbp are unlikely to be linked to specific virus-like particles, as no unique virus-like particles have been identified in samples prepared using various purification techniques. For this reason, these large dsRNAs were previously referred to as enigmatic dsRNAs, endogenous dsRNAs, or RNA plasmids.
