= Small temporal RNA =

Small temporal RNA (abbreviated stRNA) regulates gene expression during roundworm development by preventing the mRNAs they bind from being translated. In contrast to siRNA, stRNAs downregulate expression of target RNAs after translation initiation without affecting mRNA stability. Nowadays, stRNAs are better known as miRNAs.

stRNAs exert negative post-transcriptional regulation by binding to complementary sequences in the 3' untranslated regions of their target genes. stRNAs are transcribed as longer precursor RNAs that are processed by the RNase Dicer/DCR-1 and members of the RDE-1/AGO1 family of proteins, which are better known for their roles in RNA interference (RNAi). stRNAs may function to control temporal identity during development in C. elegans and other organisms.
