= PIWIL1 =

Protein-coding gene in the species Homo sapiens

Available structures
| PDB | Ortholog search: PDBe RCSB |
| PDB | List of PDB id codes 2L5C, 2L5D, 3O3I, 3O6E, 3O7V |

Identifiers
- Aliases: PIWIL1, CT80.1, HIWI, MIWI, PIWI, piwi like RNA-mediated gene silencing 1
- External IDs: OMIM: 605571; MGI: 1928897; HomoloGene: 37963; GeneCards: PIWIL1; OMA:PIWIL1 - orthologs

Gene location (Human)
| Chr. | Chromosome 12 (human) |
| Band | 12q24.33 | Start | 130,337,887 bp |
| Band | 12q24.33 | End | 130,372,637 bp |

Gene location (Mouse)
| Chr. | Chromosome 5 (mouse) |
| Band | 5 G1.3|5 67.86 cM | Start | 128,779,588 bp |
| Band | 5 G1.3|5 67.86 cM | End | 128,832,538 bp |
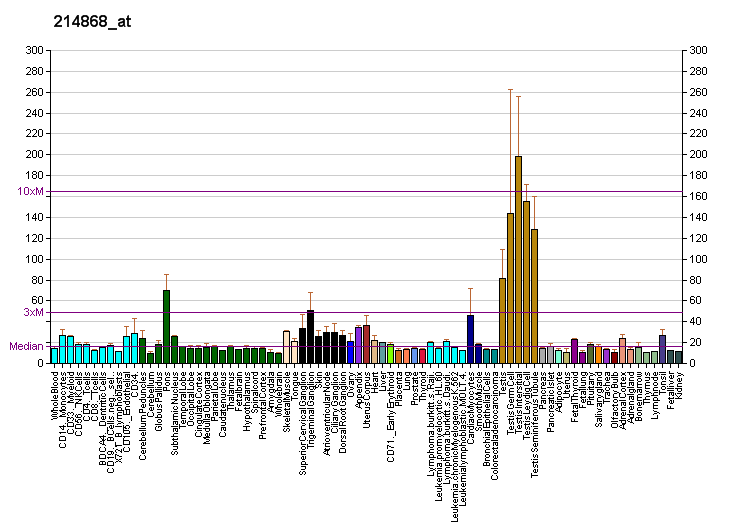
RNA expression pattern
| Bgee | Human / Mouse (ortholog); Top expressed in: right testis; left testis; gonad; testicle; anterior pituitary; right lobe of thyroid gland; right uterine tube; canal of the cervix; spleen; superior frontal gyrus / Top expressed in: spermatocyte; seminiferous tubule; zygote; secondary oocyte; spermatid; female urethra; primary oocyte; primary spermatocyte; embryo; Gonadal ridge; More reference expression data |
| BioGPS | More reference expression data |
Gene ontology
| Molecular function | protein kinase binding; RNA binding; single-stranded RNA binding; nucleic acid binding; protein binding; mRNA binding; nuclease activity; endonuclease activity; endoribonuclease activity; hydrolase activity; metal ion binding; piRNA binding; protein-containing complex binding; polysome binding; mRNA cap binding complex binding |
| Cellular component | polysome; nucleus; mRNA cap binding complex; dense body; P granule; cytoplasm; chromatoid body |
| Biological process | multicellular organism development; regulation of translation; meiosis; cell differentiation; gene silencing; spermatogenesis; negative regulation of transposition; piRNA metabolic process; nucleic acid phosphodiester bond hydrolysis; RNA phosphodiester bond hydrolysis, endonucleolytic; spermatid development |
Sources:Amigo / QuickGO
Orthologs
| Species | Human | Mouse |
| Entrez | 9271 | 57749 |
| Ensembl | ENSG00000275051; ENSG00000125207 | ENSMUSG00000029423 |
| UniProt | Q96J94 | Q9JMB7 |
| RefSeq (mRNA) | NM_001190971; NM_004764 | NM_021311 |
| RefSeq (protein) | NP_001177900; NP_004755 | NP_067286 |
| Location (UCSC) | Chr 12: 130.34 – 130.37 Mb | Chr 5: 128.78 – 128.83 Mb |
| PubMed search |
- Wikidata
| View/Edit Human | View/Edit Mouse |

Piwi-like protein 1 is a protein that in humans is encoded by the PIWIL1 gene.

This gene encodes a member of the PIWI subfamily of Argonaute proteins, evolutionarily conserved proteins containing both PAZ and Piwi motifs that play important roles in stem cell self-renewal, RNA silencing, and translational regulation in diverse organisms.

The encoded protein may play a role as an intrinsic regulator of the self-renewal capacity of germline and hematopoietic stem cells.
