= Nuage (cell biology) =

Nuage are Drosophila melanogaster germline granules. Nuage are the hallmark of Drosophila melanogaster germline cells, which have an electron-dense perinuclear structure and can silence the selfish genetic elements in Drosophila melanogaster. The term 'Nuage' comes from the French word for 'cloud', as they appear as nebulous electron-dense bodies by electron microscopy. They are found in nurse cells of the developing Drosophila melanogaster egg chamber and are composed of various types of proteins, including RNA-helicases, Tudor domain proteins, Piwi-clade Argonaute proteins, in addition to a PRMT5 methylosome composed of Capsuléen and its co-factor, Valois (MEP50).

See piRNA for more information.
