= RNA-induced transcriptional silencing =

Form of RNA interference

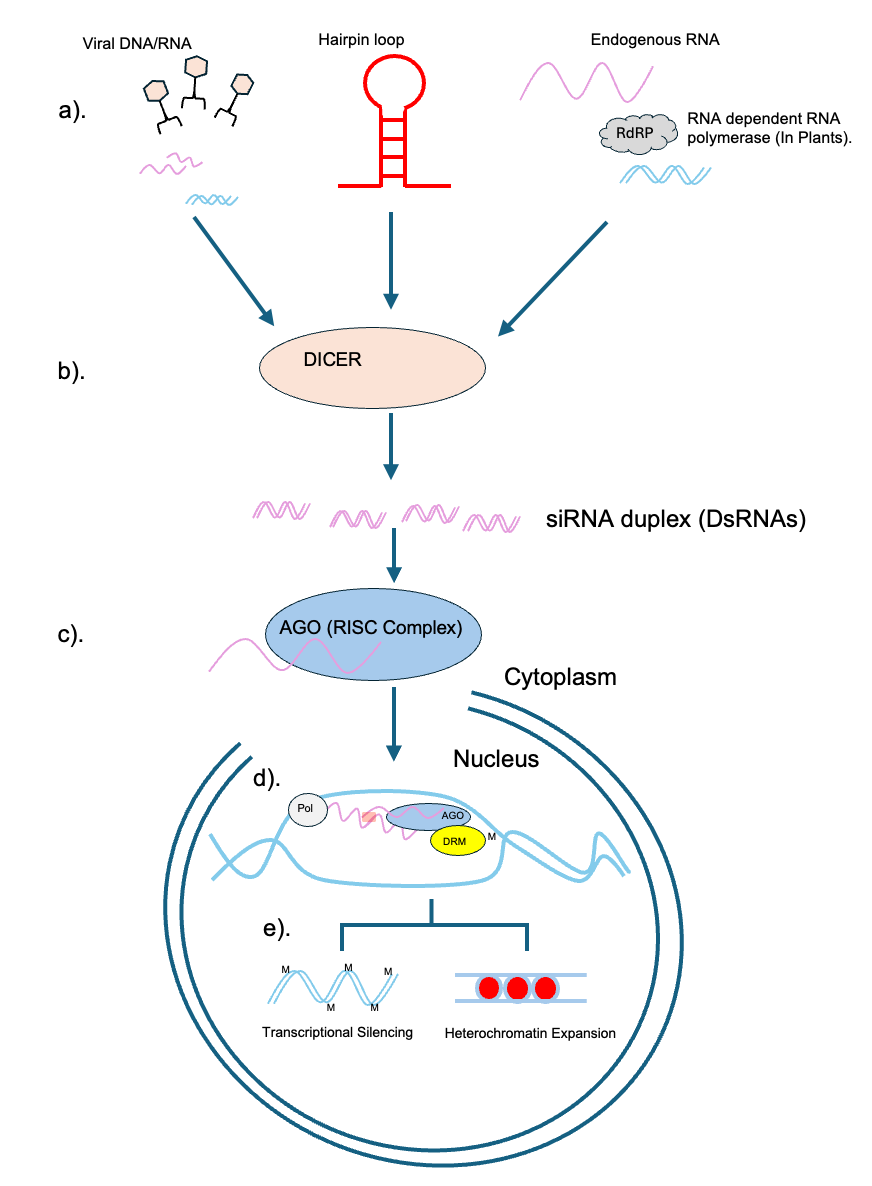
Figure. RNA induced transcriptional silencing complex illustration. a) sources can be viral DNA/RNA, endogenous RNA hairpins, endogenous RNA dependent RNA polymerases in Plants. b) Dicer protein processing small double stranded RNAs c) small RNAs loaded into argonase (AGO) complex for precise localization d) AGO (RISC) complex interacting with nascent RNA with the help of sRNA and recruitment of DNA methyltransferase adding methyl groups to DNA, e) DNA methylation resulting in transcriptional silencing and heterochromatin expansion. Concept adapted from (Rosa et al., 2018) PMID: PMID: 29979927.

RNA-induced transcriptional silencing (RITS) is a form of RNA interference by which short RNA molecules – such as small interfering RNA (siRNA) – trigger the downregulation of transcription of a particular gene or genomic region. This is usually accomplished by posttranslational modification of histone tails (e.g. methylation of lysine 9 of histone H3) which target the genomic region for heterochromatin formation. The protein complex that binds to siRNAs and interacts with the methylated lysine 9 residue of histones H3 (H3K9me2) is the RITS complex.

RITS was discovered in the fission yeast Schizosaccharomyces pombe, and has been shown to be involved in the initiation and spreading of heterochromatin in the mating-type region and in centromere formation. The RITS complex in S. pombe contains at least a piwi domain-containing RNase H-like argonaute, a chromodomain protein Chp1, and an argonaute interacting protein Tas3 which can also bind to Chp1, while heterochromatin formation has been shown to require at least argonaute and an RNA-dependent RNA polymerase. Loss of these genes in S. pombe results in abnormal heterochromatin organization and impairment of centromere function, resulting in lagging chromosomes on anaphase during cell division.

== Function and mechanisms ==
Small interfering RNA(siRNAs) plays a key role in transcriptional regulation. RITS complex bind to nascent RNAs and recruit methyltransferases, promoting H3K9 methylation. The maintenance of heterochromatin regions by RITS complexes has also been described as a self-reinforcing feedback loop, in which RITS complexes stably bind the methylated histones of a heterochromatin region using the Chp1 protein and induce co-transcriptional degradation of any nascent messenger RNA (mRNA) transcripts, which are then used as RNA-dependent RNA polymerase substrates to replenish the complement of siRNA molecules to form more RITS complexes. The RITS complex localizes to heterochromatic regions through the base pairing of the nascent heterochromatic transcripts as well as through the Chp chromodomain which recognizes methylated histones found in heterochromatin. Once incorporated into the heterochromatin, the RITS complex is also known to play a role in the recruitment of other RNAi complexes as well as other chromatin modifying enzymes to specific genomic regions. Heterochromatin formation, but possibly not maintenance, is dependent on the ribonuclease protein dicer, which is used to generate the initial complement of siRNAs. In yeast, RNAi mediates the heterochromatin formation. CLRC (clr4 methyltransferase complex) deposits H3K9 methylation along centromeric regions. Reader proteins binds to those marks recruiting RITS, enforcing a feedback loop in which RITS promotes the methyltransferase recruitment, hence spreading the heterochromatin. RITS complex also expands heterochromatin by co-transcriptional gene silencing mechanism. In co-transcriptional silencing nascent transcripts are cleaved by argonaute, reducing the transcription. Meanwhile RITS recruits the methyltransferase complex, promoting the H3k9 methylation. Functional link between RNAi and chromatin modifying pathways also suggests silencing amplification.

== Importance in other species ==
The relevance of observations from fission yeast mating-type regions and centromeres to mammals is not clear, as some evidence suggests that heterochromatin maintenance in mammalian cells is independent of the components of the RNAi pathway. It is known, however, that plants and animals have analogous mechanism for small RNA-guided heterochromatin formation, and it is believed that the mechanisms described above for S. pombe are highly conserved and play some role in heterochromatin formation in mammals as well. In higher eukaryotes, RNAi-dependent heterochromatic silencing appears to play a larger role in germline cells than in primary cells or cell lines, and is only one of the many different forms of gene silencing used throughout the genome, making it more difficult to study.

The role of RNAi in transcriptional gene silencing in plants has been characterized fairly well, and functions primarily through DNA methylation via the RdDM pathway. In this process, which is distinct from the process described above, argonaut-bound siRNA recognizes nascent RNA transcripts or the target DNA to guide the methylation and silencing of the target genomic region. In arabidopsis RdDM is required for the transcriptional silencing of transposons and DNA repeats.
