= Chromatoid body =

Structure within the cytoplasm of male germ cells

In cellular biology, a chromatoid body is a dense structure in the cytoplasm of male germ cells. It is composed mainly of RNA and RNA-binding proteins and is thus a type of RNP granule. Chromatoid body-like granules first appear in spermatocytes and condense into a single granule in round spermatids. The structure disappears again when spermatids start to elongate. The chromatoid body is crucial for spermatogenesis, but its exact role in the process is not known. Following significant strides in the understanding of small non-coding RNA mediated gene regulation and Piwi-interacting RNA (piRNA) and their roles in germline development, the function of chromatoid bodies (CBs) has been somewhat elucidated. However, due to similarities with RNP granules found in somatic cells – such as stress granules and processing bodies – chromatoid body is thought to be involved in post-transcriptional regulation of gene expression. Postmeiotic germ cell differentiation induces the accumulation of piRNAs and proteins of piRNA machinery along with several distinct RNA regulator proteins. Although evidence suggests CB involvement in mRNA regulation and small RNA mediated gene regulation, the mechanism of action remains obscure.

Mammalian male germ cells are characterized by distinct RNA- and protein-rich cytoplasmic domains clearly observed by electron microscopy and occasionally visible in light microscopy. These non-membranous structures are called germinal granules, germline granules, or germ granules, or Nuage (meaning "cloud", in French) because of their amorphous cloud-like appearance.

In late pachytene spermatocytes, a kind of Nuage appears to be associated with the nuclear envelope and intermingled with small vesicles, but not associated with mitochondria, and it is believed to provide precursor material for the CB. By the late diplotene stage, prominent germ granule structures are disintegrated, but in secondary spermatocytes, the CB-like material aggregates again into large (0.5 mm) dense bodies. After meiosis in step 1 round spermatids, these dense bodies aggregate and form one single big granule per cell, which is commonly called the CB.

== History ==
Due to its big size and distinct characteristics, the CB was first described as early as 1876, when von Brunn, who observed it in early rat spermatids, referred to it as "Protoplasmaanhäufungen". Benda (1891) observed similar cytoplasmic granules in the spermatocytes of guinea pig and called them "chromatoide Nebenkörper". Regaud (1901) described the rat spermatogenesis in detail, called these cytoplasmic granules "corpus chromatoides" (chromatoid bodies). The name CB derives from the fact that this cytoplasmic granule is strongly stained by basic dyes similarly to chromosomes and nucleoli.

== Formation ==
In step 7 round spermatids, the CB starts decreasing in size, and its degradation proceeds in the course of spermatid elongation. During steps 7–8 the CB also starts moving towards the basis of the flagellum. In elongating spermatids, the CB dissociates into two different structures: a ring around the basis of the flagellum and a dense sphere. This functional transformation of the CB requires testis-specific serine/ threonine kinases TSSK1 and TSSK2 that specifically localize in the late form of the CB. The ring migrates to the caudal end of the developing middle piece of the flagellum, moving in front of the mitochondria that are engaged in mitochondrial sheath morphogenesis. The dense sphere is instead discarded with most of the cytoplasm in the residual body. In step 16 elongating spermatids, the characteristic structure of the CB is no longer visible.

Given the timing of its appearance, the dynamic localization, as well as other distinctive features and the known protein and RNA composition, the CB is likely to have a specialized role in RNA regulation during post-meiotic stages of male germ cell differentiation.
