= Phased small interfering RNA =

Class of plant small RNAs

Phased small interfering RNAs (phasiRNAs) are a class of plant small RNAs produced from precursor PHAS transcripts in a precise, regularly spaced, or "phased", pattern. They are a subset of small interfering RNAs (siRNAs), are usually 21 or 24 nucleotides in length, and are generated from both protein-coding and noncoding precursor RNAs through pathways involving microRNAs, RNA-dependent RNA polymerases, and Dicer-like proteins.

A subset of phasiRNAs, known as trans-acting siRNAs (tasiRNAs), has experimentally demonstrated activity in trans, targeting genes distinct from the loci from which they are produced; the broader term phasiRNA is used for phased siRNAs whether or not such trans-acting function has been established. These tasiRNAs were first described in Arabidopsis thaliana in 2004 through genetic and molecular studies of the RDR6- and SGS3-dependent pathway. Subsequent work showed that microRNA-guided cleavage establishes the register for phased processing of TAS transcripts. The term phasiRNA was later adopted for the broader class of phased secondary siRNAs, including those for which activity in trans has not been demonstrated.

PhasiRNAs are widespread across land plants and can arise from large numbers of precursor PHAS loci. They regulate diverse gene families, including nucleotide-binding leucine-rich repeat (NLR) disease-resistance genes, and in flowering plants they also include reproductive classes that accumulate in developing anthers. In grasses, distinct reproductive 21-nucleotide and 24-nucleotide phasiRNAs show stage-specific accumulation during premeiotic, meiotic, and postmeiotic development and are associated with male fertility.

== Biogenesis ==
PhasiRNA biogenesis is typically initiated by microRNA-guided cleavage of a precursor transcript; a 22-nucleotide microRNA is an especially effective trigger of phasiRNA production. After the initiating cleavage event, the precursor is converted into double-stranded RNA by RNA-DEPENDENT RNA POLYMERASE 6 (RDR6), with participation of SUPPRESSOR OF GENE SILENCING 3 (SGS3). The double-stranded RNA intermediate is processed by Dicer-like proteins. DCL4 typically generates 21-nucleotide phasiRNAs, whereas DCL5 is associated with 24-nucleotide reproductive phasiRNAs in monocots. The regular head-to-tail arrangement of phasiRNAs reflects sequential processing from a defined start site established by the initiating cleavage event.

In Arabidopsis, microRNA-guided cleavage and phasiRNA production from TAS loci and several other endogenous PHAS transcripts were found to be associated with membrane-bound polysomes on the rough endoplasmic reticulum (ER). Whether this localization is shared by reproductive and other phasiRNA pathways in diverse plants remains unclear.

== Types and classification ==
Phased small interfering RNAs (phasiRNAs) are classified based on their genomic origin, functional properties, and size classes. Early work in this field focused on a subset known as trans-acting small interfering RNAs (tasiRNAs), but subsequent studies established that tasiRNAs represent only one class within a broader and more diverse group of phased siRNAs.

PHAS loci are usually inferred from small-RNA sequencing by statistically significant periodicity in mapped reads. Counts therefore vary with tissue sampling, developmental stage, sequencing depth, genome assembly and the annotation algorithm; different computational methods can produce different sets of loci and false positives.

TasiRNAs are defined by their experimentally demonstrated ability to regulate genes in trans, targeting transcripts distinct from their loci of origin. They are typically produced from noncoding TAS loci and participate in well-characterized regulatory pathways, including those controlling auxin response factors and developmental timing.

Beyond tasiRNAs, phasiRNAs are generated from a wide range of genomic loci, including both protein-coding and noncoding transcripts. Many phasiRNAs originate from protein-coding genes, particularly large gene families such as NLR R-genes, pentatricopeptide repeat (PPR) genes, and transcription factor families including MYB, ARF, and NAC genes.

Noncoding PHAS loci also contribute substantially to phasiRNA production. These include canonical TAS genes as well as numerous long noncoding RNA precursors, particularly in reproductive tissues where large numbers of PHAS loci have been identified.

A major component of classification is based on phasiRNA length, with two predominant size classes: 21-nucleotide and 24-nucleotide phasiRNAs. These classes differ in their biogenesis pathways, triggering microRNAs, and developmental timing.

Reproductive phasiRNAs, particularly in grasses (Poaceae), represent a highly specialized and abundant class. Distinct populations of 21-nt and 24-nt phasiRNAs accumulate at specific stages of anther development, including premeiotic, meiotic, and postmeiotic stages, and are associated with male fertility and reproductive success. However, reproductive phasiRNAs have been reported in female organs including the pistil.

== Functions ==
The functions of phasiRNAs differ among classes. tasiRNAs and several other 21-nucleotide phasiRNAs act post-transcriptionally through Argonaute-guided cleavage or repression of complementary RNAs. Direct cleavage targets have also been identified for reproductive 21-nucleotide phasiRNAs in rice meiocytes and maize. In contrast, the direct targets and molecular mode of action of most reproductive 24-nucleotide phasiRNAs remain unresolved.

A major biological role of phasiRNAs is in reproductive development. In grasses and other flowering plants, large populations of phasiRNAs accumulate in anthers and show strong temporal regulation, with distinct classes of 21-nucleotide and 24-nucleotide phasiRNAs associated with premeiotic, meiotic, and postmeiotic stages of development. These reproductive phasiRNAs support male fertility, as demonstrated by polymorphisms in 21-nt phasiRNAs that yield conditional male sterility in rice, and loss of DCL5 depletes 24-nucleotide reproductive phasiRNAs and causes temperature-sensitive male sterility in both maize and durum wheat. The rice Argonaute protein MEL1 is required for normal premeiotic germ-cell divisions and meiotic progression, and MEL1 preferentially associates with 21-nucleotide reproductive phasiRNAs bearing a 5′ cytosine.

Outside reproductive tissues, several phasiRNA pathways regulate development and defense. The conserved miR390–TAS3 pathway produces tasiRNAs that target AUXIN RESPONSE FACTOR transcripts and thereby influence leaf polarity, lateral-root development and other aspects of developmental patterning. Other phasiRNAs arise from large families of NLR disease-resistance genes, PPR genes and MYB transcription-factor genes. NLR-derived phasiRNAs can limit immune-receptor transcript accumulation, whereas the biological functions of many PPR- and other gene-derived phasiRNAs remain less well characterized.

== Evolution and diversity ==
PhasiRNAs are widespread across land plants but vary greatly in number, precursor type, triggers, and biological roles among lineages, with many more loci identified in grasses. Arabidopsis has relatively few PHAS loci compared with many other plant genomes, totaling approximately 35 loci in the genome.

Reproductive phasiRNA pathways also differ among flowering plant groups, including differences in timing and triggers of 24-nt phasiRNA accumulation. Small RNA sequencing studies have annotated more than 10,000 PHAS loci in the genome of wheat, many of which produce reproductive phasiRNAs detected predominantly in developing anthers. On the other hand, the genome of another monocot, asparagus, encodes only around 70 phasiRNA-producing loci. The reason for such variability in numbers of loci, compared across plant species, is unknown.

Plant reproductive phasiRNAs have been compared to animal Piwi-interacting RNA (piRNAs) because both are highly abundant at defined stages of reproductive development, associate with members of the Argonaute protein family, and are required for fertility in some species. The pathways evolved independently and differ substantially in biogenesis: phasiRNAs are produced through Dicer-like cleavage of double-stranded RNA, whereas piRNAs are generated from single-stranded precursors through Dicer-independent pathways involving PIWI proteins. Many piRNAs also participate directly in transposable-element silencing, whereas the targets of most reproductive phasiRNAs remain poorly defined.

== See also ==
- MicroRNA
- Small interfering RNA
- Trans-acting siRNA
- RNA interference
- Argonaute protein
