= Granule (cell biology) =

Small particle, often in plants

In cell biology, a granule is a small particle barely visible by light microscopy. The term is most often used to describe a secretory vesicle containing important components of cell physiology. Examples of granules include platelet granules and insulin granules. Some granules such as the ones mentioned are considered organelles, other such as starch granules are not.

== Types ==
There are mainly two types of granules based on the presence or absence of a membrane: membrane-bound granules, and non-membrane-bound granules. Eosinophilic granules, basophilic granules, and secretory granules are examples of membrane-bound granules, while P-granules and stress granules are examples of non-membrane-bound granules.

== In leukocytes ==
A group of leukocytes, called granulocytes, are white blood cells containing enzyme granules that play a significant role in the immune system. Granulocytes include neutrophils, eosinophils, and basophils which attack bacteria or parasites, and respond to allergens. Each type of granulocyte contains enzymes and chemicals tailored to its function.

Neutrophils for example, contain primary granules, secondary granules, tertiary granules, and secretory vesicles. Primary vesicles, also known as azurophilic granules, secrete hydrolytic enzymes including elastase, myeloperoxidase, cathepsins, and defensins that aid in pathogen destruction. Secondary granules, or specific granules, in neutrophils contain iron-binding protein lactoferrin. Tertiary granules contain matrix metalloproteinases.

Other immune cells, such as natural killer cells, contain granular enzymes, including perforin and proteases which can lead to the lysis of neighboring cells.

The process by which granule contents are released is known as degranulation. This tightly controlled process is initiated by immunological stimuli and results in the movement of granules to the cell membrane for fusion and release.

== In platelets ==
The granules of platelets are classified as dense granules and alpha granules.

α-Granules are unique to platelets and are the most abundant of the platelet granules, numbering 50–80 per platelet 2. These granules measure 200–500 nm in diameter and account for about 10% of platelet volume. They contain mainly proteins, both membrane-associated receptors (for example, αIIbβ3 and P-selectin) and soluble cargo (for example, platelet factor 4 [PF4] and fibrinogen). Proteomic studies have identified more than 300 soluble proteins that are involved in a wide variety of functions, including hemostasis (for example, von Willebrand factor [VWF] and factor V), inflammation (for example, chemokines such as CXCL1 and interleukin-8), and wound healing (for example, vascular endothelial growth factor [VEGF] and fibroblast growth factor [FGF]) 3. The classic representation of α-granules as spherical organelles with a peripheral limiting membrane, a dense nucleoid, and progressively lucent peripheral zones on transmission electron microscopy is probably simplistic and may be in part a preparation artifact. Electron tomography with three-dimensional reconstruction of platelets is notable for a significant percentage of tubular α-granules that generally lack VWF 4. More recent work using transmission electron microscopy and freeze substitution dehydration of resting platelets shows that α-granules are ovoid with a generally homogeneous matrix and that tubes form from α-granules upon activation 5. Thus, whether or not there exists significant structural heterogeneity among α-granules remains to be completely resolved. α-Granule exocytosis is evaluated primarily by plasma membrane expression of P-selectin (CD62P) by flow cytometry or estimation of the release of PF4, VWF, or other granule cargos.

Dense granules (also known as δ-granules) are the second most abundant platelet granules, with 3–8 per platelet. They measure about 150 nm in diameter 2. These granules, unique to the platelets, are a subtype of lysosome-related organelles (LROs), a group that also includes melanosomes, lamellar bodies of the type II alveolar cells, and lytic granules of cytotoxic T cells. Dense granules mainly contain bioactive amines (for example, serotonin and histamine), adenine nucleotides, polyphosphates, and pyrophosphates as well as high concentrations of cations, particularly calcium. These granules derive their name from their electron-dense appearance on whole mount electron microscopy, which results from their high cation concentrations . Dense granule exocytosis is typically evaluated by ADP/ATP release by using luciferase-based luminescence techniques, release of preloaded [ 3H] serotonin, or membrane expression of lysosome-associated membrane protein 2 (LAMP2) or CD63 by flow cytometry.

Other platelet granules have been described. Platelets contain about 1–3 lysosomes per platelet and peroxisomes, the platelet-specific function of which remains unclear. Lysosomal exocytosis is typically evaluated by estimation of released lysosomal enzymes such as beta hexosaminidase. An electron-dense granule defined by the presence of Toll-like receptor 9 (TLR9) and protein disulfide isomerase (PDI), termed the T granule, has also been described, although its existence remains controversial. PDI and other platelet-borne thiol isomerases have been reported to be packaged within a non-granular compartment derived from the megakaryocyte endoplasmic reticulum (ER), which may be associated with the dense tubular system.

== In beta cells (insulin) ==
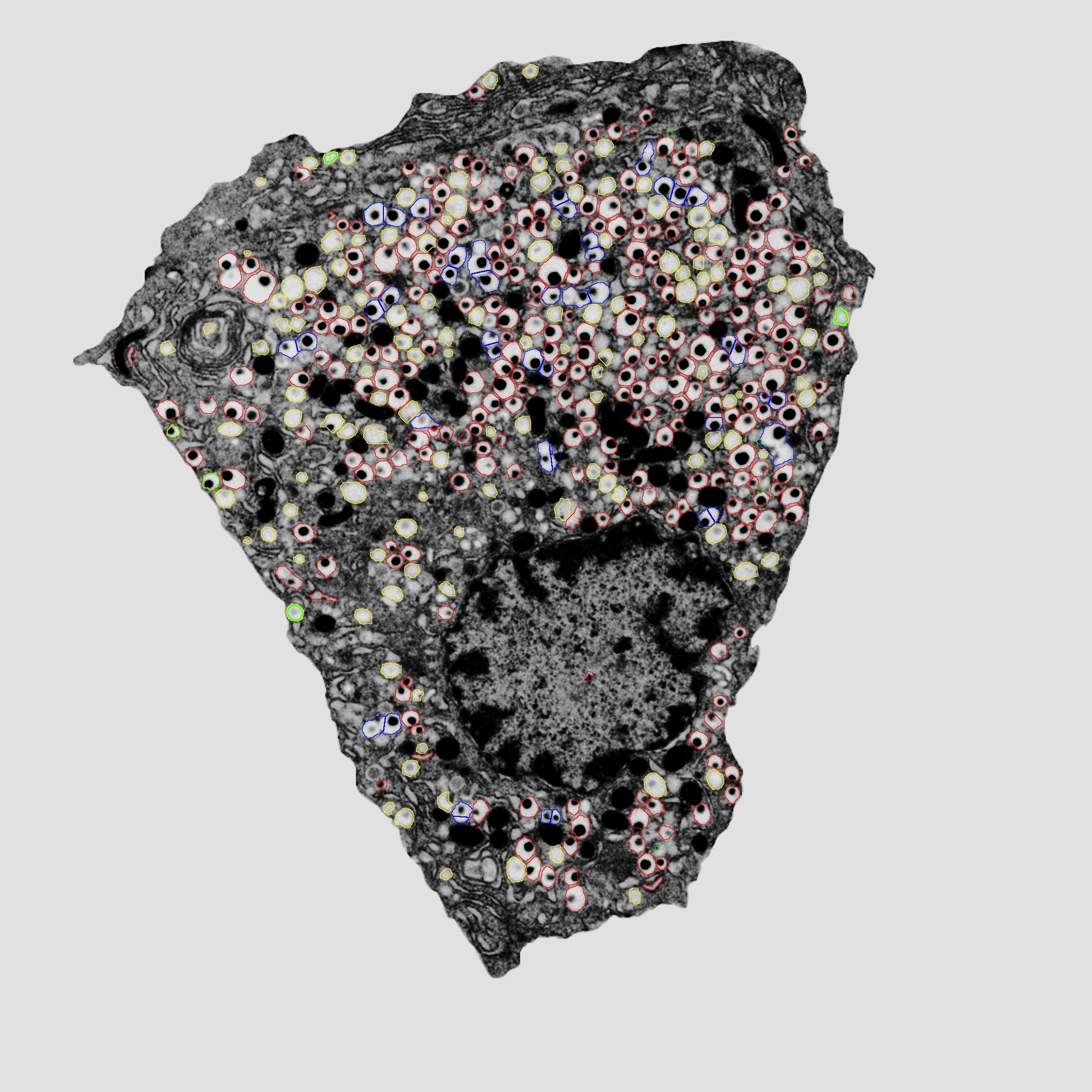
Beta cell with insulin granules, which are the dark black spots surrounded by a white area called a halo.

Insulin granules are a specific type of granule found in pancreatic beta cells. Insulin granules are secretory granules, which are responsible for the storage and secretion of insulin, a hormone that regulates the concentration of glucose in the bloodstream to maintain homeostasis. The release of insulin by granules is signaled by plasma glucose concentrations and the resultant influx of calcium ions in pancreatic cells, which initiate granule exocytosis. Insulin release is biphastic, as insulin is first released in the primary phase by granules closest to the plasma membrane. In the secondary phase, insulin granules are recruited from reserves deeper in the beta cell for a slower release rate.

Insulin granules undergo a significant maturation process. First, precursor proinsulin molecules are synthesized in the endoplasmic reticulum and packaged in the golgi network. Insulin granules bud from the trans golgi network and are further sorted via clathrin-coated vesicle transport. After budding, insulin secretory granules are acidified, activating endoproteases PC1/3 and PC2 to convert proinsulin into insulin. The clatherin coating is released and the insulin secretory granules are transported across the cell via actin filaments and microtubules.

== In germline cells ==
In 1957, André and Rouiller first coined the term "nuage". (French for "cloud"). Its amorphous and fibrous structure occurred in drawings as early as in 1933 (Risley). Today, the nuage is accepted to represent a characteristic, electrondense germ plasm organelle encapsulating the cytoplasmic face of the nuclear envelope of the cells destined to the germline fate. The same granular material is also known under various synonyms: dense bodies, mitochondrial clouds, yolk nuclei, Balbiani bodies, perinuclear P granules in Caenorhabditis elegans, germinal granules in Xenopus laevis, chromatoid bodies in mice, and polar granules in Drosophila. Molecularly, the nuage is a tightly interwoven network of differentially localized RNA-binding proteins, which in turn localize specific mRNA species for differential storage, asymmetric segregation (as needed for asymmetric cell division), differential splicing and/or translational control. The germline granules appear to be ancestral and universally conserved in the germlines of all metazoan phyla.

Many germline granule components are part of the piRNA pathway and function to repress transposable elements.

== In plants (starch) ==
Starch is an insoluble carbohydrate used for energy storage in plant cells. There are two forms of starch, transitionary starch and storage starch. Transitionary starch is synthesised via photosynthesis and found in photosynthetic plant tissue cells, such as the leaves. Storage starch is reserved for longer periods of time and is found in non-photosynthetic tissue cells such as the roots or stem. Storage starch is utilized during germination or regrowth, or when energy demands exceed net energy production from photosynthesis.

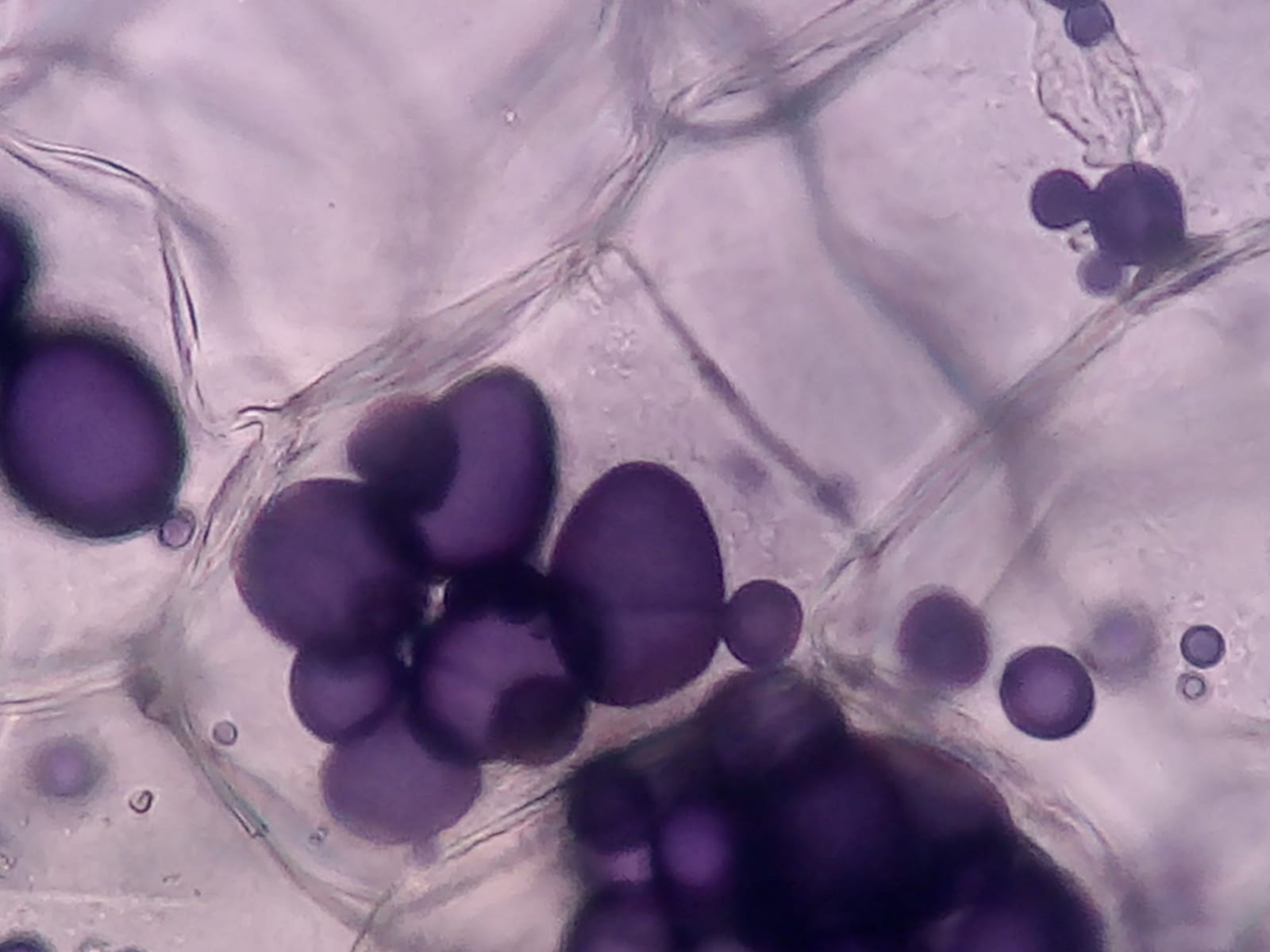
Starch granules in potato cells.

Starch is stored in granule form. Starch granules are composed of a crystalline structure of amylopectin and amylose. Amylopectin forms the structure of the starch granule, with branching and non branching A-chains, B-chains, and C-chains. Amylose fills in the gaps of the amylopectin structure. Under a microscope, starch granules look like concentric layers, referred to as “growth rings”. Starch granules also contain granule-bound starch synthase and amylopectin synthesizing enzymes. Notably, starch granules vary in size and morphology across plant tissues and species.

== In stress ==
Stress granules are composed of protein and RNA, and form from pools of mRNAs that have not started translation as a result of environmental conditions including oxidative stress, temperature, toxins, and osmotic pressure. Stress granules also contain translation initiation factors, RNA binding proteins (which account for 50% of the granule's components), and non-RNA binding proteins. They are formed via protein-protein interactions between mRNA binding proteins and are influenced by protein methylation or phosphorylation. They contain a “core” with high concentrations of proteins and mRNA and a less-concentrated outer region. Stress granules are dynamic in structure, and can dock and exchange with p-bodies or the cytoplasm. They can also perform fusion and fission in the cytoplasm.

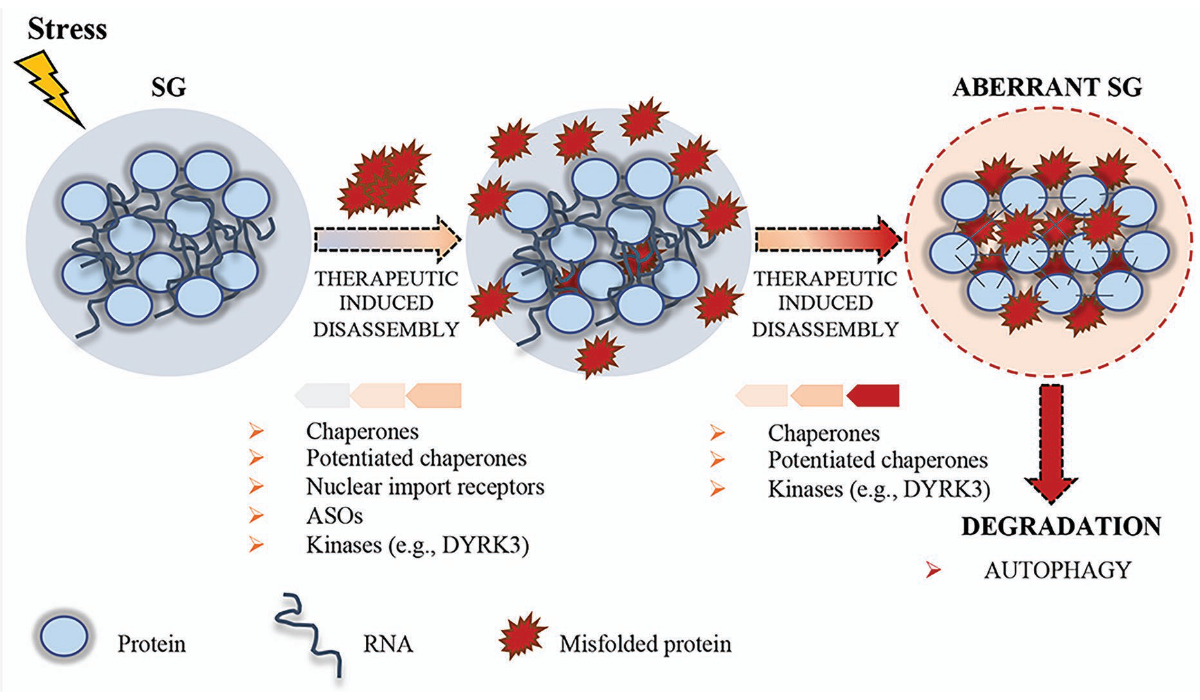
Assembly and disassembly of stress granules.

Stress granule assembly is dependent upon the conditions of the cell. In yeast, stress granules form under conditions of high heat. Stress granules are of significance for their roles in mRNA localization, cell signaling pathways, and antiviral processes. Once disassembled, the RNA inside stress granules can go back to translation or be removed as cellular waste. Stress granules may provide protection for mRNA from interactions with the cytosol. Moreover, mutations that affect the formation or degradation of stress granules may contribute to neurodegenerative conditions such as ALS and FTLD. However, the effects of stress granules on cell physiology are still under study.
