= Nuage =

Nuage (French for "cloud") may refer to:

== Music ==
- "Nuages", a 1940 jazz piece by Django Reinhardt
- Nuages (Live at Yoshi's, vol. 2), a 1997 album by Joe Pass
- Nuage, a 2007 album by Sylvain Chauveau
- "Nuages", the first movement of Nocturnes by Claude Debussy
- "Nuages", a song on the 1984 album Three of a Perfect Pair by King Crimson
- "Nuages", a song by Grégoire from the 2008 album Toi + Moi

== Other uses ==
- Nuage (cell biology), a specific term for fruit-fly germline granules
- Nuage (horse), the leading sire in Germany for 1917
- Nuage (film), a 2007 French film with Aurore Clément

== See also ==
- Nuages du Monde, a 2006 album by Canadian group Delirium
- ''Nuages gris", an 1881 piano solo by Franz Liszt
