= P element =

Class of transposable elements that cause hybrid dysgenesis in eukaryotes

P elements are transposable elements that were discovered in Drosophila as the causative agents of genetic traits called hybrid dysgenesis. The transposon is responsible for the P trait of the P element and it is found only in wild flies. They are also found in many other eukaryotes.

The name was first suggested by evolutionary biologist Margaret Kidwell, who, together with James Kidwell and John Sved, researched hybrid dysgenesis in Drosophila. They referred to strains as P of paternal and M of maternal if they contributed to hybrid dysgenesis in this reproductive role.

The P element encodes for an enzyme known as P transposase. Unlike laboratory-bred females, wild-type females are thought also to express an inhibitor to P transposase function, produced by the very same element. This inhibitor reduces the disruption to the genome caused by the movement of P elements, allowing fertile progeny. Evidence for this comes from crosses of laboratory females (which lack the P transposase inhibitor) with wild-type males (which have P elements). In the absence of the inhibitor, the P elements can proliferate throughout the genome, disrupting many genes and often proving lethal to progeny or rendering them sterile.

P elements are commonly used as mutagenic agents in genetic experiments with Drosophila. One advantage of this approach is that the mutations are easy to locate. In hybrid dysgenesis, one strain of Drosophila mates with another strain of Drosophila, producing hybrid offspring and causing chromosomal damage known to be dysgenic. Hybrid dysgenesis requires a contribution from both parents. For example, in the P-M system, where the P strain contributes paternally and M strain contributes maternally, dysgenesis can occur. The reverse cross, with an M cytotype father and a P mother, produces normal offspring, as it crosses in a P x P or M x M manner. P male chromosomes can cause dysgenesis when crossed with an M female.

== Characteristics ==
The P element is a class II transposon, and moves by a DNA-based "cut and paste" mechanism. The recognition sequence comprises four exons separated by three introns. Complete splicing of the introns produces the transposase enzyme, while alternative partial splicing of introns 1 and 2, leaving only intron 3 in the mRNA transcript, encodes the P element repressor. The complete, autonomous P element encodes a transposase enzyme, which recognizes the 31-bp terminal inverted repeats at either end of the P element and catalyzes P element excision and re-insertion. The complete element is 2,907 bp in length; non-autonomous P elements contain an internal deletion of varying length which abolishes transposase production, but such elements can still be mobilized if a functional transposase is encoded elsewhere in the genome. P element insertion and subsequent excision necessarily leaves behind 8-bp direct repeats at the excision site; thus the presence of such repeats is indicative of previous P element activity.

All P elements have a canonical structure containing 31-bp terminal inverted repeats and 11-bp internal inverted repeats located at the THAP domain of the transposase. The shortest and longest P elements are non-autonomous elements. The longest P elements encode transposase needed for transposition. The same sequence that encodes the transposase also encodes a suppressor of transposition, which accumulates in the cytoplasm during the development of cells. Thus, in a cross of a P or M male with a P female, the female cytoplasm contains the suppressor, which binds to any P elements and prevents their transposition.

== Hybrid dysgenesis ==
Hybrid dysgenesis refers to the high rate of mutation in germ line cells of Drosophila strains resulting from a cross of males with autonomous P elements (P Strain/P cytotype) and females that lack P elements (M Strain/M cytotype). The hybrid dysgenesis syndrome is marked by temperature-dependent sterility, elevated mutation rates, and increased chromosomal rearrangement and recombination.

The hybrid dysgenesis phenotype is affected by the transposition of P elements within the germ-line cells of offspring of P strain males with M strain females. Transposition only occurs in germ-line cells, because a splicing event needed to make transposase mRNA does not occur in somatic cells.

Hybrid dysgenesis manifests when crossing P strain males with M strain females and not when crossing P strain females (females with autonomous P elements) with M strain males. The eggs of P strain females contain high amounts of a repressor protein that prevents transcription of the transposase gene. The eggs of M strain mothers, which do not contain the repressor protein, allow for transposition of P elements from the sperm of fathers. In P strain females, the repressors are found in the cytoplasm. Hence, when P strain males fertilize M strain females (whose cytoplasm contain no repressor), the male contributes its genome with the P element but not the male cytoplasm leading to P strain progeny.

This effect contributes to piRNAs being inherited only in the maternal line, which provides a defense mechanism against P elements.

== Use in molecular biology ==
The P element has found wide use in Drosophila research as a mutagen. The mutagenesis system typically uses an autonomous but immobile element, and a mobile nonautonomous element. Flies from subsequent generations can then be screened by phenotype or PCR. Naturally-occurring P elements contain coding sequence for the enzyme transposase and recognition sequences for transposase action. Transposase regulates and catalyzes the excision of a P element from the host DNA, cutting at the two recognition sites, and then reinserting randomly. It is the random insertion that may interfere with existing genes, or carry an additional gene, that can be used for genetic research.

To use this as a useful and controllable genetic tool, the two parts of the P element must be separated to prevent uncontrolled transposition. The normal genetic tools are DNA coding for transposase with no transposase recognition sequences so it cannot insert and a "P Plasmid". P Plasmids always contain a Drosophila reporter gene, often a red-eye marker (the product of the white gene), and transposase recognition sequences. They may contain a gene of interest, an E. coli selectable marker gene, often some kind of antibiotic resistance, an origin of replication or other associated plasmid "housekeeping" sequences.

=== Methods of usage ===
There are two main ways to utilise these tools:

==== Fly transformation ====
1. Clone the P element into a plasmid and transform and grow this in bacteria.
2. Eliminate the P transposase and replace it with your gene of interest.
3. Microinject the posterior end of an early-stage (pre-cellularization) embryo with DNA coding for transposase and a plasmid with the reporter gene, gene of interest and transposase recognition sequences.
4. Random transposition occurs, inserting the gene of interest and reporter gene.
5. Once the gene of interest has been inserted it is no longer mobile because it cannot produce its own P transposase.
6. Grow flies and cross to remove genetic variation between the cells of the organism. (Only some of the cells of the organism will have been transformed. Hopefully, some of these transformed cells end up in the germ line. A transformed gamete will give rise to an organism with no variation between its cells).
7. Look for flies expressing the reporter gene. These carry the inserted gene of interest, so can be investigated to determine the phenotype due to the gene of interest.

The inserted gene may have damaged the function of one of the host's genes. Several lines of flies are required so comparison can take place and ensure that no additional genes have been knocked out.

==== Insertional mutagenesis ====
1. Microinject the embryo with DNA coding for transposase and a plasmid with the reporter gene and transposase recognition sequences (and often the E. coli reporter gene and origin of replication, etc.).
2. Random transposition occurs, inserting the reporter gene randomly. The insertion tends to occur near actively transcribed genes, as this is where the chromatin structure is loosest, so the DNA is most accessible.
3. Grow flies and cross to remove genetic variation between the cells of the organism (see above).
4. Look for flies expressing the reporter gene. These have experienced a successful transposition, so can be investigated to determine the phenotype due to mutation of existing genes.

Possible mutations:

1. Insertion in a translated region => hybrid protein/truncated protein. Usually causes loss of protein function, although more complex effects are seen.
2. Insertion in an intron => altered splicing pattern/splicing failure. Usually results in protein truncation or the production of inactive mis-spliced products, although more complex effects are common.
3. Insertion in 5' (the sequence that will become the mRNA 5' UTR) untranslated region => truncation of transcript. Usually results in failure of the mRNA to contain a 5' cap, leading to less efficient translation.
4. Insertion in promoter => reduction/complete loss of expression. Always results in greatly reduced protein production levels. The most useful type of insertion for analysis due to the simplicity of the situation.
5. Insertion between promoter and upstream enhancers => loss of enhancer function/hijack of enhancer function for reporter gene.† Generally reduces the level of protein specificity to cell type, although complex effects are often seen.

===== Enhancer trapping =====
The hijack of an enhancer from another gene allows the analysis of the function of that enhancer. This, especially if the reporter gene is for a fluorescent protein, can be used to help map expression of the mutated gene through the organism, and is a useful tool for looking at gene expression patterns (temporally and spatially).

=== Other usage ===
These methods are referred to as reverse genetics. Reverse genetics is an approach to discover the function of a gene by analyzing the phenotypic effects of specific gene sequences obtained by DNA sequencing

=== Analysis of mutagenesis products ===
Once the function of the mutated protein has been determined it is possible to sequence/purify/clone the regions flanking the insertion by the following methods:

==== Inverse PCR ====
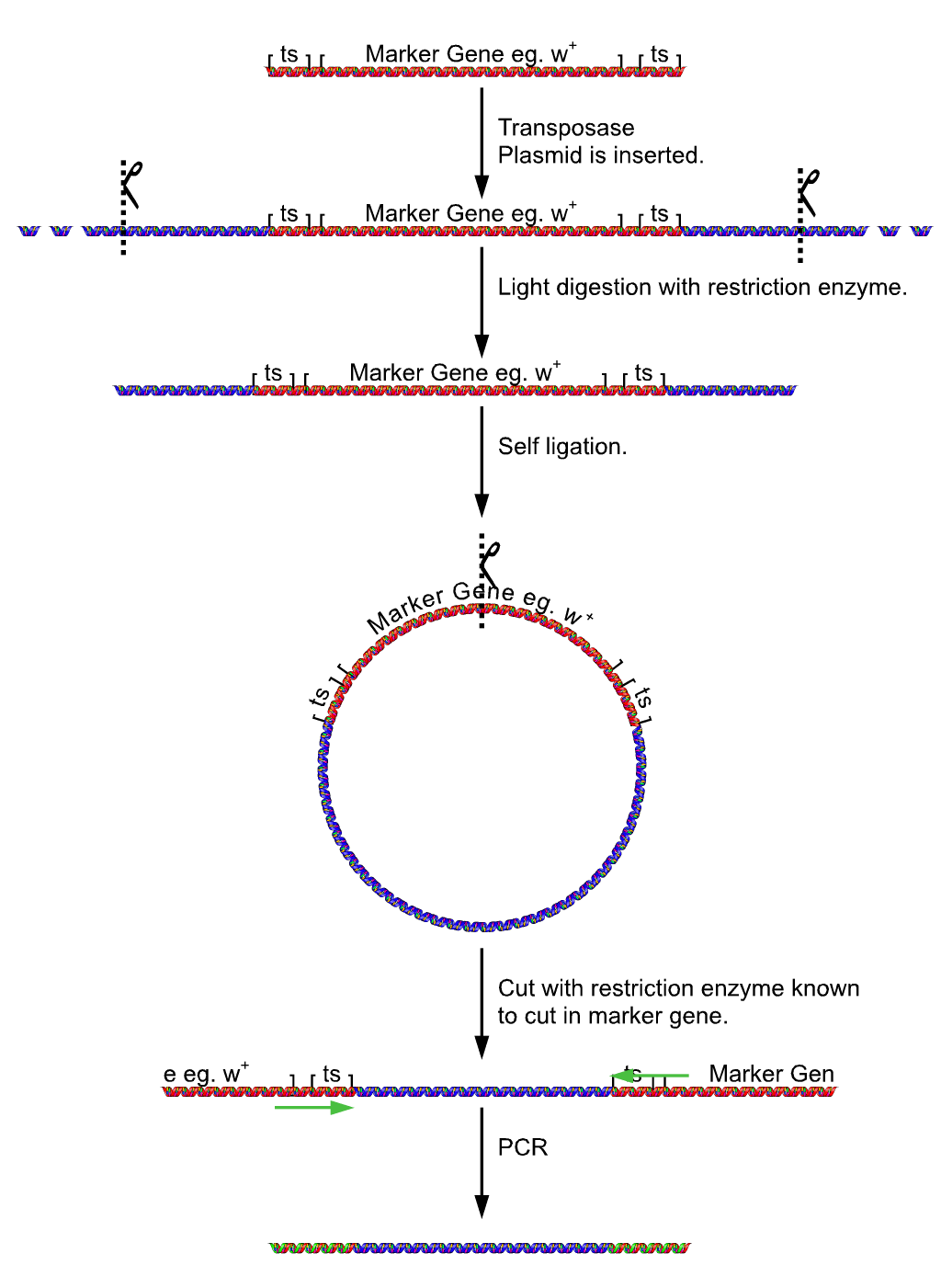
Process of analysis of DNA flanking a known insert by PCR

1. Isolate the fly genome.
2. Undergo a light digest (using an enzyme [enzyme 1] known NOT to cut in the reporter gene), giving fragments of a few kilobases, a few with the insertion and its flanking DNA.
3. Self ligate the digest (low DNA concentration to ensure self ligation) giving a selection of circular DNA fragments, a few with the insertion and its flanking DNA.
4. Cut the plasmids at some point in the reporter gene (with an enzyme [enzyme 2] known to cut very rarely in genomic DNA, but is known to in the reporter gene).
5. Using primers for the reporter gene sections, the DNA can be amplified for sequencing.

The process of cutting, self ligation and re cutting allows the amplification of the flanking regions of DNA without knowing the sequence. The point at which the ligation occurred can be seen by identifying the cut site of [enzyme 1].

==== Plasmid rescue ====
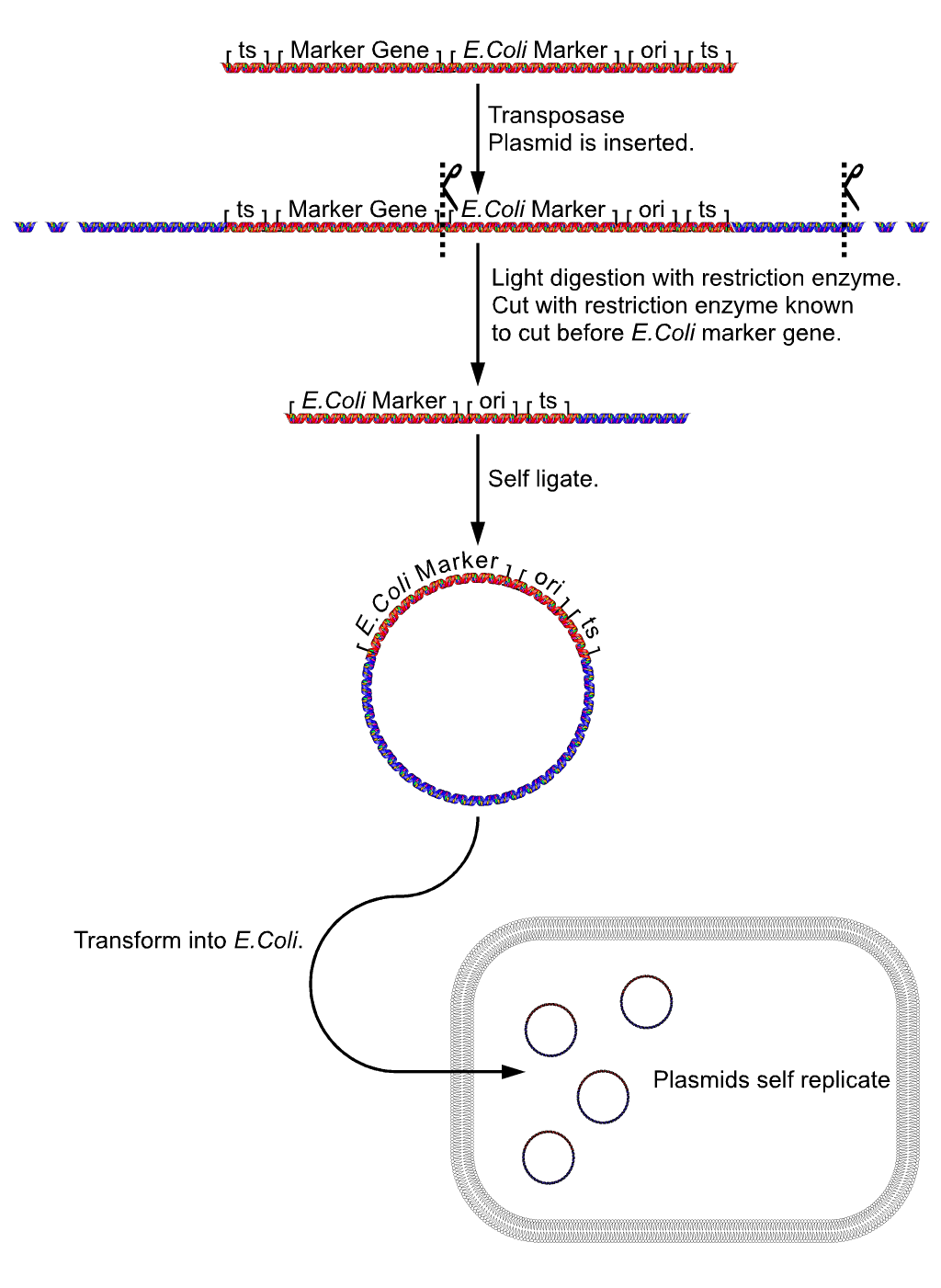
Process of analysis of DNA flanking a known insert by plasmid rescue

1. Isolate the fly genome.
2. Undergo a light digest (using an enzyme [enzyme 1] known to cut in the boundary between the reporter gene and the E. coli reporter gene and plasmid sequences), giving fragments of a few kilobases, a few with the E. coli reporter, the plasmid sequences and its flanking DNA.
3. Self ligate the digest (low DNA concentration to ensure self ligation) giving a selection of circular DNA fragments, a few with the E. coli reporter, the plasmid sequences and its flanking DNA.
4. Insert the plasmids into E. coli cells (e.g. by electroporation).
5. Select plasmids for the E. coli selectable marker gene. Only successful inserts of plasmids with the plasmid 'housekeeping' sequences will express this gene.
6. The gene can be cloned for further analysis.

=== Example of P element application in molecular biology ===
==== Discovery of PIWI proteins ====
The discovery of the PIWI protein subfamily began in 1997 using a classical genetics approach involving P element-mediated random mutagenesis. One of the isolated mutant lineages presented a sterility phenotype. Analysis of this mutant lineage led to the discovery of a nucleoplasmic protein named PIWI. Subsequent studies on this protein family demonstrated its major role in transposon silencing through the ping-pong model of the PIWI-interacting RNA (piRNA) pathway.

PIWI proteins have also been implicated in tumor development. In Drosophila, brain tumors caused by the loss of l(3)mbt ectopically express genes normally restricted to the germline, including piwi, aubergine, and vasa. Silencing these genes reduces tumor growth, suggesting that their ectopic expression contributes to malignancy. These findings, obtained in an animal model, point to the PIWI-piRNA pathway as a potential therapeutic target, but the underlying mechanism remains to be elucidated, and no clinical application has been established to date.

== Literature ==
- Leland Hartwell et al.. 2004. Genetics – From Genes to Genomes 2nd Ed. McGraw-Hill
- Engels, W. R. P Elements in Drosophila
