= Mating-type locus =

Specialized region in genomes of some yeast

The mating-type locus is a specialized region in the genomes of some yeast and other fungi, usually organized into heterochromatin and possessing unique histone methylation patterns. The genes in this region regulate the mating type of the organism and therefore determine key events in its life cycle, such as whether it will reproduce sexually or asexually. In fission yeast such as S. pombe, the formation and maintenance of the heterochromatin organization is regulated by RNA-induced transcriptional silencing, a form of RNA interference responsible for genomic maintenance in many organisms. Mating type regions have also been well studied in budding yeast S. cerevisiae and in the fungus Neurospora crassa.

== Organization ==
=== Ascomycytes ===
Most ascomycetes have two mating types. In yeast they are called MATa and MATα. The former contains a homeodomain gene. The latter contains a homeodomain and an alpha-box gene. Ascomycete mating type loci variants are called idiomorphs rather than alleles due to the uncertainty of the origin by common descent.

In filamentous ones they are called "MAT1-1" and "MAT1-2". The former contains a regulatory protein MAT1-1-1 with an alpha box motif, as in the yeast mating type MATα1, while the latter contains a protein MAT1-2-1 with a high motility-group (HMG) DNA-binding motif. Informally they can be called MAT1 and MAT2.

Each mating-type locus may code for more than one gene. The main gene is designated MAT1-1-1 (αbox) and MAT1-2-1 (HMG). Additional gene are designated MAT1-1-2, MAT1-1-3, MAT1-2-2, etc. An attempt is made to make sure that each designation refers to the same family of proteins. Informally these are to be called MAT1-2, MAT1-3, etc. Similarly the different genes in the yeast mating type locus are called Mata1, Matα1, Matα2, etc.

=== Basidiomycetes ===
Basidiomycetes can have thousands of different mating types due to having more than one locus. A typical setup involves two loci called A and B, though they are sometimes broken down into subloci with many more variations. Because the same general families of genes are present, these are probably true "alleles" and are usually called as such. The ancestral setup is probably tetrapolar.

The A locus consists of pairs of genes with one member each of the homeodomain (HD) protein families HD1 and HD2. The two resemble yeast Matα2 and Mata1 respectively. The B locus codes for multiallelic pheromone systems and for receptor systems, specifically a G protein-coupled receptor system.

== Mating-type switching ==
In the budding yeast Saccharomyces cerevisiae, mating-type is determined by two non-homologous alleles at the mating-type locus. S. cerevisiae has the capability of undergoing mating-type switching, that is conversion of some haploid cells in a colony from one mating-type to the other. Mating-type switching can occur as frequently as once every generation. Switching involves homologous recombinational repair of a site specific, programmed double-strand break, a highly organized process. This process replaces one mating type allelic DNA sequence with the sequence encoding the alternative mating-type allele. When two haploid cells of opposite mating type come into contact they can mate to form a diploid cell, a zygote, that may then undergo meiosis. Meiosis tends to occur under nutritionally limiting conditions associated with DNA damage.

== See also ==
- Mating of yeast
