= Mating type =

Term in reproductive biology

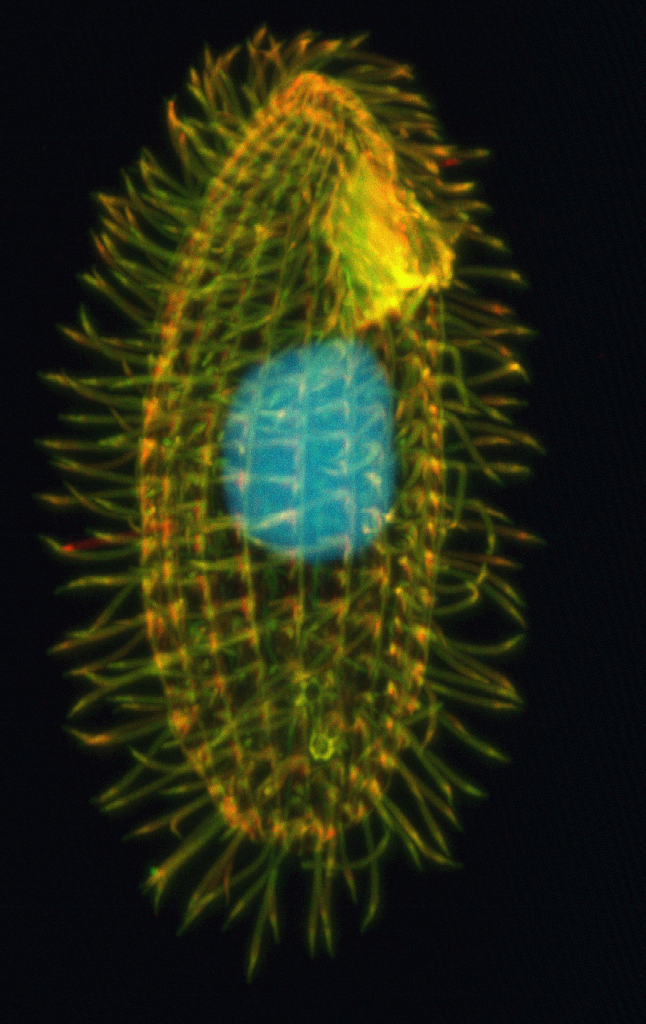
The ciliate Tetrahymena has seven mating types.

Mating types are the microorganism equivalent to sexes in multicellular lifeforms and are thought to be the ancestor to distinct sexes. They also occur in multicellular organisms such as fungi.

== Definition ==
Mating types are the microorganism equivalent to sex in higher organisms and occur in isogamous species. Depending on the group, different mating types are often referred to by numbers, letters, or simply "+" and "−" instead of "male" and "female", which refer to "sexes" or differences in size between gametes. Syngamy can only take place between gametes carrying different mating types.

Mating types are extensively studied in fungi. Among fungi, mating type is determined by chromosomal regions called mating-type loci. Furthermore, it is not as simple as "two different mating types can mate", but rather, a matter of combinatorics. As a simple example, most basidiomycetes have a "tetrapolar heterothallism" mating system: there are two loci, and mating between two individuals is possible if the alleles on both loci are different. For example, if there are 3 alleles per locus, then there would be 9 mating types, each of which can mate with 4 other mating types. By multiplicative combination, it generates a vast number of mating types.

== Mechanism ==
As an illustration, the model organism Coprinus cinereus has two mating-type loci called A and B. Both loci have 3 groups of genes. At the A locus are 6 homeodomain proteins arranged in 3 groups of 2 (HD1 and HD2), which arose by gene duplication. At the B locus, each of the 3 groups contain one pheromone G-protein-coupled receptor and usually two genes for pheromones.

The A locus ensures heterothallism through a specific interaction between HD1 and HD2 proteins. Within each group, a HD1 protein can only form a functional heterodimer with a HD2 protein from a different group, not with the HD2 protein from its own group. Functional heterodimers are necessary for a dikaryon-specific transcription factor, and its lack arrests the development process. They function redundantly, so it is only necessary for one of the three groups to be heterozygotic for the A locus to work.

Similarly, the B locus ensures heterothallism through a specific interaction between pheromone receptors and pheromones. Each pheromone receptor is activated by pheromones from other groups, but not by the pheromone encoded by the same group. This means that a pheromone receptor can only trigger a signaling cascade when it binds to a pheromone from a different group, not when it binds to the pheromone from its own group. They also function redundantly.

In both cases, the mechanism is based on a "self-incompatibility" principle, where the proteins or pheromones from the same group are incompatible with each other, but compatible with those from different groups. This promotes some degree of outcrossing. Outcrossing, through complementation, could provide the benefit of masking recessive deleterious mutations in genes which function in the dikaryon and/or diploid stage of the life cycle.

Similarly, the Schizophyllum commune has 2 gene groups (Aα, Aβ) for homeodomain proteins on the A locus, and 2 gene groups (Bα, Bβ) for pheromones and receptors on the B locus. Aα has 9 alleles, Aβ has 32, Bα has 9, and Bβ has 9. The two gene groups at the A locus function independently but redundantly, so only one group out of the two needs to be heterozygotic for it to work. Similarly for the two gene groups at the B locus. Thus, mating between two individuals succeeds if

$[(A\alpha 1 \neq A\alpha 2) \text{ OR }(A\beta 1 \neq A\beta 2)] \text{ AND } [(B\alpha 1 \neq B\alpha 2) \text{ OR }(B\beta 1 \neq B\beta 2)]$

Thus there are $9 \times 32 \times 9 \times 9=23328$ mating types, each of which can mate with $(9 \times 32-1) \times (9 \times 9-1)=22960$ other mating types.

Ascomycytes such as yeasts have a simpler mating-type system where there is usually just two general types, MAT1-1 (MATa) and MAT1-2 (MATα), on one locus.

== Occurrence ==
Reproduction by mating types is especially prevalent in fungi.

=== Ascomycytes ===
Filamentous ascomycetes usually have two mating types referred to as "MAT1-1" and "MAT1-2". Under standard nomenclature, MAT1-1 (which may informally be called MAT1) encodes for a regulatory protein with an alpha box motif, as in the yeast mating type MATα1, while MAT1-2 (informally called MAT2) encodes for a protein with a high motility-group (HMG) DNA-binding motif. Ascomycete mating type genes are called idiomorphs rather than alleles due to the uncertainty of the origin by common descent.

The mating types in yeast, a non-filamentous ascomycete, are referred to as MATa and MATα. The former contains a homeodomain gene. The latter contains a homeodomain and an alpha-box gene.

The proteins encoded by mating-type genes are transcription factors which regulate both the early and late stages of the sexual cycle. Heterothallic ascomycetes produce gametes, which present a single Mat idiomorph, and syngamy will only be possible between gametes carrying complementary mating types. On the other hand, homothallic ascomycetes produce gametes that can fuse with every other gamete in the population (including its own mitotic descendants) most often because each haploid contains the two alternate forms of the Mat locus in its genome.

Each mating-type locus may code for more than one gene. The main gene is designated MAT1-1-1 (αbox) and MAT1-2-1 (HMG). Additional gene are designated MAT1-1-2, MAT1-1-3, MAT1-2-2, etc. An attempt is made to make sure that each designation refers to the same family of proteins. Informally these are to be called MAT1-2, MAT1-3, etc. Similarly the different genes in the yeast mating type locus are called Mata1, Matα1, Matα2, etc.

=== Basidiomycete ===
Basidiomycetes can have thousands of different mating types due to having more than one locus. Usually there are two main locus, though these can still be broken down into numeous subloci. The A locus consists of pairs of genes with one member each of the homeodomain (HD) protein families HD1 and HD2. The two resemble yeast Matα2 and Mata1 respectively. The B locus codes for multiallelic pheromone systems and for receptor systems, specifically a G protein-coupled receptor system. Because the same general families of genes are present, these are probably true "alleles" and are usually called as such. The ancestral setup is probably tetrapolar.

== Evolution ==
Mating types likely predate anisogamy, and sexes evolved directly from mating types or independently in some lineages.

Studies on green algae have provided evidence for the evolutionary link between sexes and mating types. In 2006 Japanese researchers found a gene in males of Pleodorina starrii that is an [orthologue] to a gene for a mating type in the Chlamydomonas reinhardtii. In Volvocales, the plus mating type is the ancestor to female.

In ciliates, multiple mating types evolved from binary mating types in several lineages. As of 2019, genomic conflict has been considered the leading explanation for the evolution of two mating types.

Secondary mating types evolved alongside simultaneous hermaphrodites in several lineages.

== See also ==
- Mating in fungi
- Mating of yeast
- Mating-type locus
- Saccharomyces cerevisiae (a and α mating types)
- Schizophyllum commune (23,328 mating types)
- Tetrahymena (7 mating types)
