= EIF2C1 =

Protein-coding gene in humans

AGO1
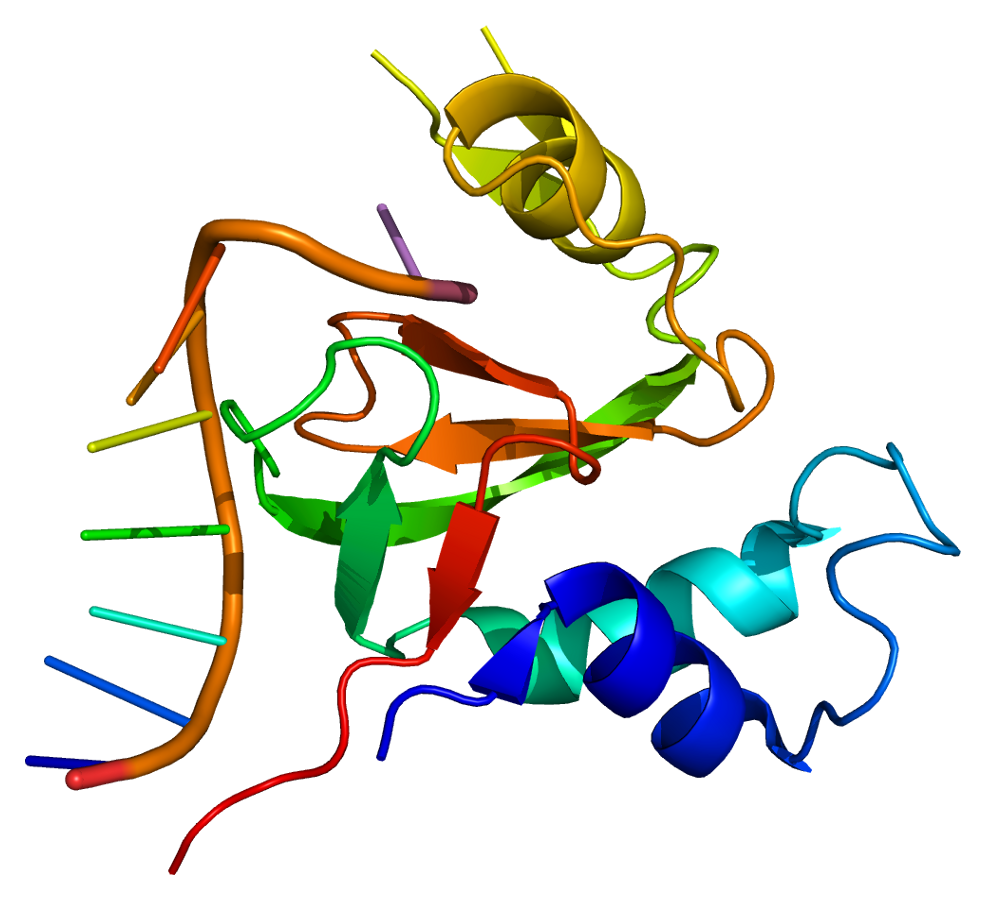

Identifiers
- Aliases: AGO1, EIF2C, EIF2C1, GERP95, Q99, hAgo1, argonaute 1, RISC catalytic component, argonaute RISC catalytic component 1, argonaute RISC component 1
- External IDs: OMIM: 606228; MGI: 2446630; GeneCards: AGO1
Available structures
PDB	Ortholog search: PDBe RCSB
PDB	List of PDB id codes 1SI2, 1SI3, 4KRE, 4KRF, 4KXT

Gene location (Human)
Chr.	Chromosome 1 (human)
Band	1p34.3	Start	35,869,808 bp
Band	1p34.3	End	35,930,532 bp

Gene location (Mouse)
Chr.	Chromosome 4 (mouse)
Band	4|4 D2.2	Start	126,328,805 bp
Band	4|4 D2.2	End	126,362,376 bp
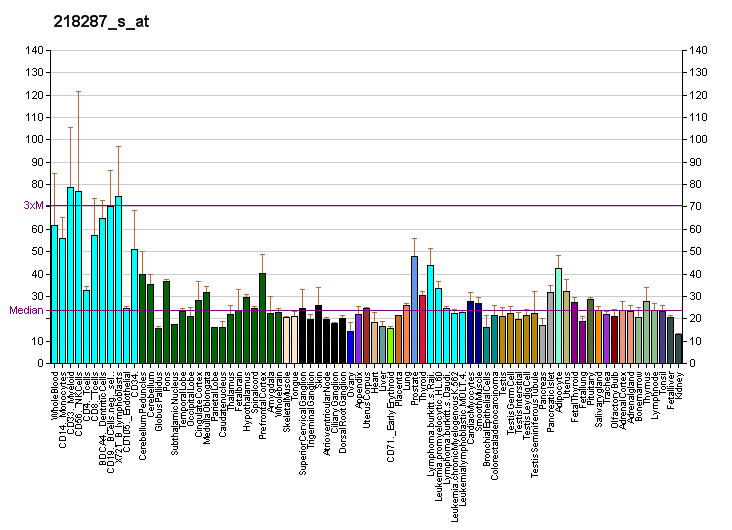
RNA expression pattern
Bgee	Human / Mouse (ortholog); Top expressed in: ganglionic eminence; visceral pleura; tendon of biceps brachii; parietal pleura; ventricular zone; hair follicle; monocyte; internal globus pallidus; tibia; stromal cell of endometrium / Top expressed in: Rostral migratory stream; superior cervical ganglion; ventricular zone; ganglionic eminence; vestibular labyrinth; ciliary body; vestibular sensory epithelium; otolith organ; iris; trigeminal ganglion; More reference expression data
BioGPS	More reference expression data
Gene ontology
Molecular function	RNA polymerase II complex binding; miRNA binding; endoribonuclease activity; RNA polymerase II cis-regulatory region sequence-specific DNA binding; protein binding; single-stranded RNA binding; RNA binding; nucleic acid binding; double-stranded RNA binding
Cellular component	cytoplasm; polysome; cytosol; RISC complex; P-body; nucleoplasm; RISC-loading complex; nucleus; ribonucleoprotein complex
Biological process	mRNA destabilization-mediated gene silencing by siRNA; regulation of transcription, DNA-templated; transcription, DNA-templated; pre-miRNA processing; nuclear-transcribed mRNA catabolic process; positive regulation of gene expression; RNA interference; miRNA-mediated gene silencing by inhibition of translation; RNA secondary structure unwinding; mRNA destabilization-mediated gene silencing by miRNA; miRNA metabolic process; regulation of translation; positive regulation of transcription by RNA polymerase II; production of miRNAs involved in gene silencing by miRNA; positive regulation of NIK/NF-kappaB signaling; Wnt signaling pathway, calcium modulating pathway; gene silencing; regulation of gene silencing by miRNA; regulation of megakaryocyte differentiation; negative regulation of gene expression; negative regulation of angiogenesis; RNA phosphodiester bond hydrolysis, endonucleolytic
Sources:Amigo / QuickGO
Orthologs
Databases	NCBI: entry; OMA: entry
Species	Human	Mouse
Entrez	26523	236511
Ensembl	ENSG00000092847	ENSMUSG00000041530
UniProt	Q9UL18	Q8CJG1
RefSeq (mRNA)	NM_012199; NM_001317122; NM_001317123	NM_153403; NM_001317173; NM_001317174; NM_001378879
RefSeq (protein)	NP_001304051; NP_001304052; NP_036331	NP_001304102; NP_001304103; NP_700452; NP_001365808
Location (UCSC)	Chr 1: 35.87 – 35.93 Mb	Chr 4: 126.33 – 126.36 Mb
PubMed search
- Wikidata
View/Edit Human	View/Edit Mouse

Protein argonaute-1 is a protein that in humans is encoded by the EIF2C1 gene.

== Function ==
This gene encodes a member of the Argonaute family of proteins which play a role in RNA interference. The encoded protein is highly basic, and contains a PAZ domain and a PIWI domain. It may interact with dicer1 and play a role in short-interfering-RNA-mediated gene silencing. This gene is located on chromosome 1 in a cluster of closely related family members including argonaute 3, and argonaute 4.
