= RNA-induced silencing complex =

Multiprotein complex

The RNA-induced silencing complex, or RISC, is a multiprotein complex, specifically a ribonucleoprotein, which functions in gene silencing via a variety of pathways at the transcriptional and translational levels. Using single-stranded RNA (ssRNA) fragments, such as microRNA (miRNA), or double-stranded small interfering RNA (siRNA), the complex functions as a key tool in gene regulation. The single strand of RNA acts as a template for RISC to recognize complementary messenger RNA (mRNA) transcript. Once found, one of the proteins in RISC, Argonaute, activates and cleaves the mRNA. This process is called RNA interference (RNAi) and it is found in many eukaryotes; it is a key process in defense against viral infections, as it is triggered by the presence of double-stranded RNA (dsRNA).

== Discovery ==
The biochemical identification of RISC was conducted by Gregory Hannon and his colleagues at the Cold Spring Harbor Laboratory. This was only a couple of years after the discovery of RNA interference in 1998 by Andrew Fire and Craig Mello, who shared the 2006 Nobel Prize in Physiology or Medicine.

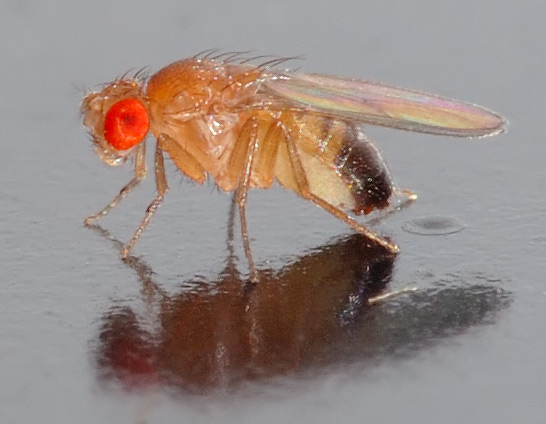
Drosophila melanogaster

Hannon and his colleagues attempted to identify the RNAi mechanisms involved in gene silencing, by dsRNAs, in Drosophila cells. Drosophila S2 cells were transfected with a lacZ expression vector to quantify gene expression with β-galactosidase activity. Their results showed co-transfection with lacZ dsRNA significantly reduced β-galactosidase activity compared to control dsRNA. Therefore, dsRNAs control gene expression via sequence complementarity.

S2 cells were then transfected with Drosophila cyclin E dsRNA. Cyclin E is an essential gene for cell cycle progression into the S phase. Cyclin E dsRNA arrested the cell cycle at the G_{1} phase (before the S phase). Therefore, RNAi can target endogenous genes.

In addition, cyclin E dsRNA only diminished cyclin E RNA — a similar result was also shown using dsRNA corresponding to cyclin A which acts in S, G_{2} and M phases of the cell cycle. This shows the characteristic hallmark of RNAi: the reduced levels of mRNAs correspond to the levels of dsRNA added.

To test whether their observation of decreased mRNA levels was a result of mRNA being targeted directly (as suggested by data from other systems), Drosophila S2 cells were transfected with either Drosophila cyclin E dsRNAs or lacZ dsRNAs and then incubated with synthetic mRNAs for cyclin E or lacZ.

Cells transfected with cyclin E dsRNAs only showed degradation in cyclin E transcripts — the lacZ transcripts were stable. Conversely, cells transfected with lacZ dsRNAs only showed degradation in lacZ transcripts and not cyclin E transcripts. Their results led Hannon and his colleagues to suggest RNAi degrades target mRNA through a 'sequence-specific nuclease activity'. They termed the nuclease enzyme RISC. Later Devanand Sarkar and his colleagues Prasanna K. Santhekadur and Byoung Kwon Yoo at the Virginia Commonwealth University elucidated the RISC activity and its molecular mechanism in cancer cells and they identified another new component of the RISC, called AEG-1 [47].

== Function in RNA interference ==
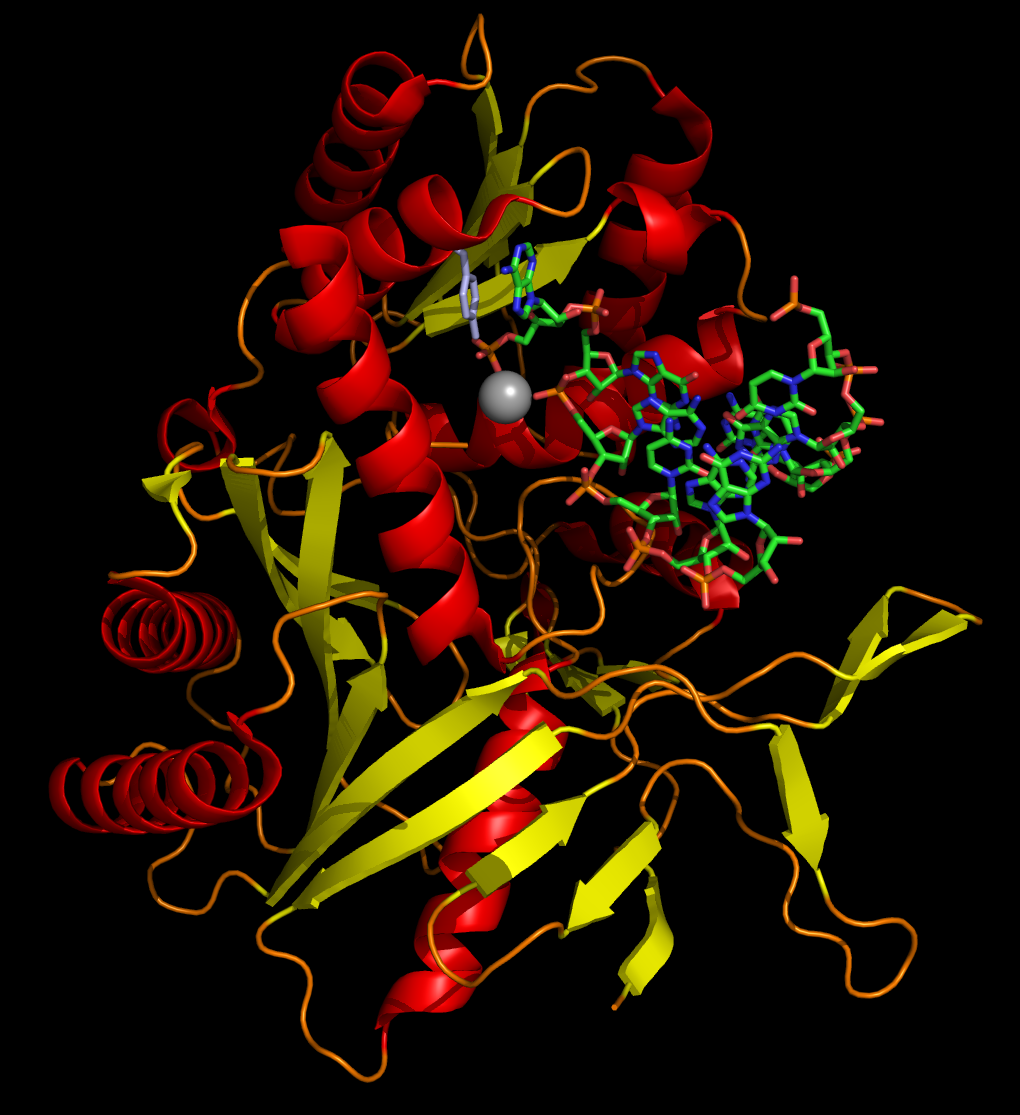
The PIWI domain of an Argonaute protein in complex with double-stranded RNA.

=== Incorporation of siRNA/miRNA ===
The RNase III Dicer is a critical member of RISC that initiates the RNA interference process by producing double-stranded siRNA or single-stranded miRNA. Enzymatic cleavage of dsRNA within the cell produces the short siRNA fragments of 21-23 nucleotides in length with a two-nucleotide 3' overhang. Dicer also processes pre-miRNA, which forms a hairpin loop structure to mimic dsRNA, in a similar fashion. dsRNA fragments are loaded into RISC with each strand having a different fate based on the asymmetry rule phenomenon, the selection of one strand as the guide strand over the other based on thermodynamic stability. The newly generated miRNA or siRNA act as single-stranded guide sequences for RISC to target mRNA for degradation.

- The strand with the less thermodynamically stable 5' end is selected by the protein Argonaute and integrated into RISC. This strand is known as the guide strand and targets mRNA for degradation.
- The other strand, known as the passenger strand, is degraded by RISC.

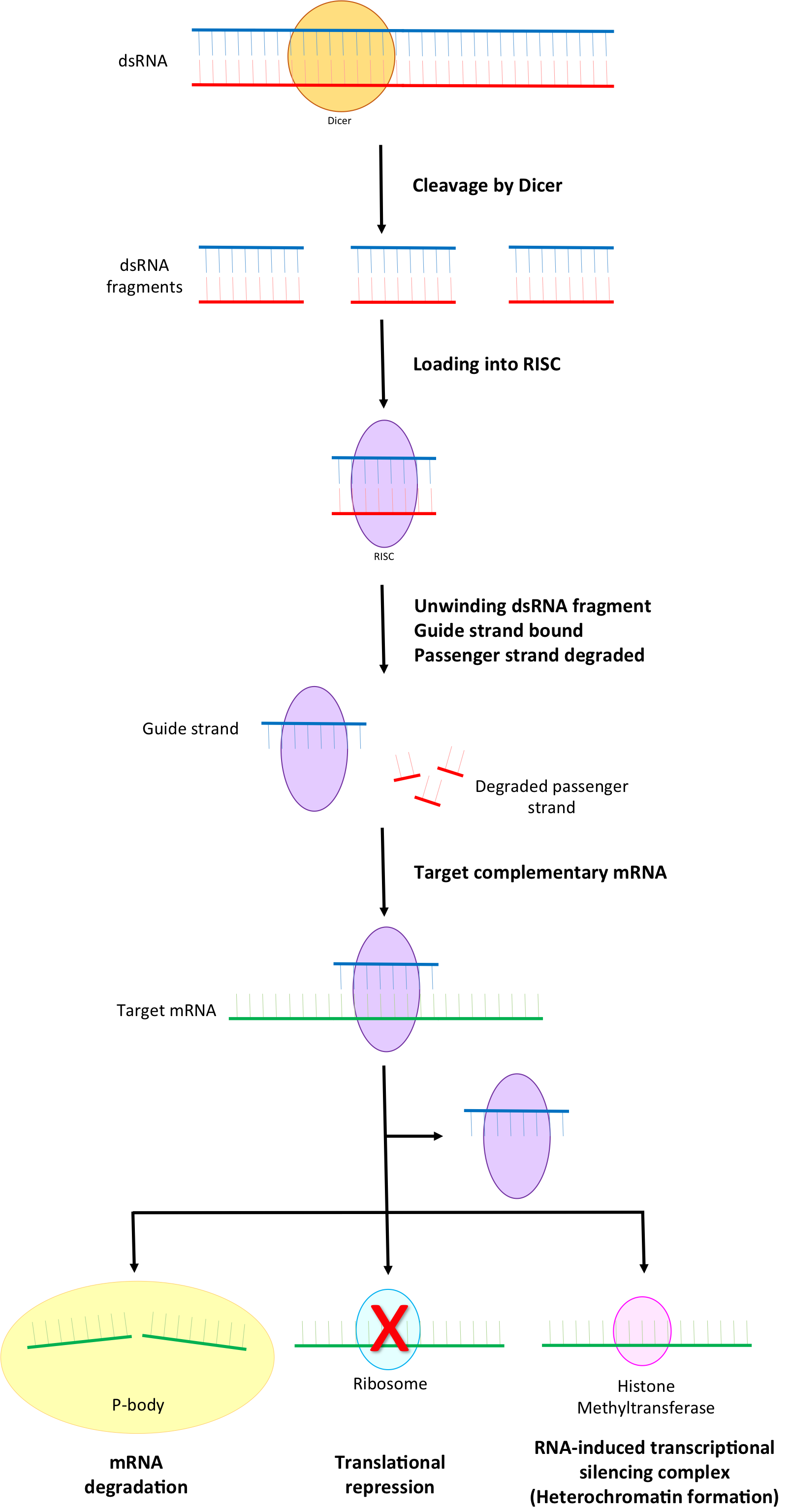
Part of the RNA interference pathway with the different ways RISC can silence genes via their messenger RNA.

=== Gene regulation ===
AGO2 (grey) in complex with a microRNA (light blue) and its target mRNA (dark blue)

Major proteins of RISC, Ago2, SND1, and AEG-1, act as crucial contributors to the gene silencing function of the complex.

RISC uses the guide strand of miRNA or siRNA to target complementary 3'-untranslated regions (3'UTR) of mRNA transcripts via Watson-Crick base pairing, allowing it to regulate gene expression of the mRNA transcript in a number of ways.

==== mRNA degradation ====
The most understood function of RISC is degradation of target mRNA which reduces the levels of transcript available to be translated by ribosomes. The endonucleolytic cleavage of the mRNA complementary to the RISC's guide strand by Argonaute protein is the key to RNAi initiation. There are two main requirements for mRNA degradation to take place:

- a near-perfect complementary match between the guide strand and target mRNA sequence, and,
- a catalytically active Argonaute protein, called a 'slicer', to cleave the target mRNA.

There are two major pathways of mRNA degradation once cleavage has occurred. Both are initiated through degradation of the mRNA's poly(A) tail, resulting in removal of the mRNA's 5' cap.

- 5'-to-3' degradation of the transcript occurs by XRN1 exonuclease in cytoplasmic bodies called P-bodies.
- 3'-to-5' degradation of the transcript is conducted by the exosome and Ski complex.

==== Translational repression ====
RISC can modulate the loading of ribosome and accessory factors in translation to repress expression of the bound mRNA transcript. Translational repression only requires a partial sequence match between the guide strand and target mRNA.

Translation can be regulated at the initiation step by:

- preventing the binding of the eukaryotic translation initiation factor (eIF) to the 5' cap. It has been noted RISC can deadenylate the 3' poly(A) tail which might contribute to repression via the 5' cap.
- preventing the binding of the 60S ribosomal subunit binding to the mRNA can repress translation.

Translation can be regulated at post-initiation steps by:

- peptide degradation,
- promoting premature termination of translation ribosomes, or,
- slowing elongation.

There is still speculation on whether translational repression via initiation and post-initiation is mutually exclusive.

==== Heterochromatin formation ====
Some RISCs are able to directly target the genome by recruiting histone methyltransferases to form heterochromatin at the gene locus, silencing the gene. These RISCs take the form of a RNA-induced transcriptional silencing complex (RITS). The best studied example is with the yeast RITS.

RITS has been shown to direct heterochromatin formation at centromeres through recognition of centromeric repeats. Through base-pairing of siRNA (guide strand) to target chromatin sequences, histone-modifying enzymes can be recruited.

The mechanism is not well understood; however, RITS degrade nascent mRNA transcripts. It has been suggested this mechanism acts as a 'self-reinforcing feedback loop' as the degraded nascent transcripts are used by RNA-dependent RNA polymerase (RdRp) to generate more siRNAs.

In Schizosaccharomyces pombe and Arabidopsis, the processing of dsRNA targets into siRNA by Dicer RNases can initiate a gene silencing pathway by heterochromatin formation. An Argonaute protein known as AGO4 interacts with the small RNAs that define heterochromatic sequences. A histone methyl transferase (HMT), H3K9, methylates histone H3 and recruits chromodomain proteins to the methylation sites. DNA methylation maintains the silencing of genes as the heterochromatin sequences can be established or spread.

==== DNA elimination ====
The siRNA generated by RISCs seem to have a role in degrading DNA during somatic macronucleus development in ciliates of the genus Tetrahymena. It is similar to the epigenetic control of heterochromatin formation and is implied as a defense against invading genetic elements.

Similar to heterochromatin formation in S. pombe and Arabidopsis, a Tetrahymena protein related to the Argonaute family, Twi1p, catalyzes DNA elimination of target sequences known as internal elimination sequences (IESs). Using methyltransferases and chromodomain proteins, IESs are heterochromatized and eliminated from the DNA.

== RISC-associated proteins ==
The complete structure of RISC is still unsolved. Many studies have reported a range of sizes and components for RISC but it is not entirely sure whether this is due to there being a number of RISC complexes or due to the different sources that different studies use.

Table 1: Complexes implicated in RISC assembly and functionBased on table by Sontheimer (2005)
Complex	Source	Known/apparent components	Estimated size	Apparent function in RNAi pathway
Dcr2-R2D2	D. melanogaster S2 cells	Dcr2, R2D2	~250 kDa	dsRNA processing, siRNA binding
RLC (A)	D. melanogaster embryos	Dcr2, R2D2	NR	dsRNA processing, siRNA binding, precursor to RISC
Holo-RISC	D. melanogaster embryos	Ago 2, Dcr1, Dcr2, Fmr1/Fxr, R2D2, Tsn, Vig	~80S	Target-RNA binding and cleavage
RISC	D. melanogaster S2 cells	Ago2, Fmr1/Fxr, Tsn, Vig	~500 kDa	Target-RNA binding and cleavage
RISC	D. melanogaster S2 cells	Ago2	~140 kDa	Target-RNA binding and cleavage
Fmr1-associated complex	D. melanogaster S2 cells	L5, L11, 5S rRNA, Fmr1/Fxr, Ago2, Dmp68	NR	Possible target-RNA binding and cleavage
Minimal RISC	HeLa cells	eIF2C1 (Ago1) or eIF2C2 (Ago2)	~160 kDa	Target-RNA binding and cleavage
miRNP	HeLa cells	eIF2C2 (ago2), Gemin3, Gemin4	~550 kDa	miRNA association, target-RNA binding and cleavage

Ago, Argonaute; Dcr, Dicer; Dmp68, D. melanogaster orthologue of mammalian p68 RNA unwindase; eIF2C1, eukaryotic translation initiation factor 2C1; eIF2C2, eukaryotic translation initiation factor 2C2; Fmr1/Fxr, D. melanogaster orthologue of the fragile-X mental retardation protein; miRNP, miRNA-protein complex; NR, not reported; Tsn, Tudor-staphylococcal nuclease; Vig, vasa intronic gene.

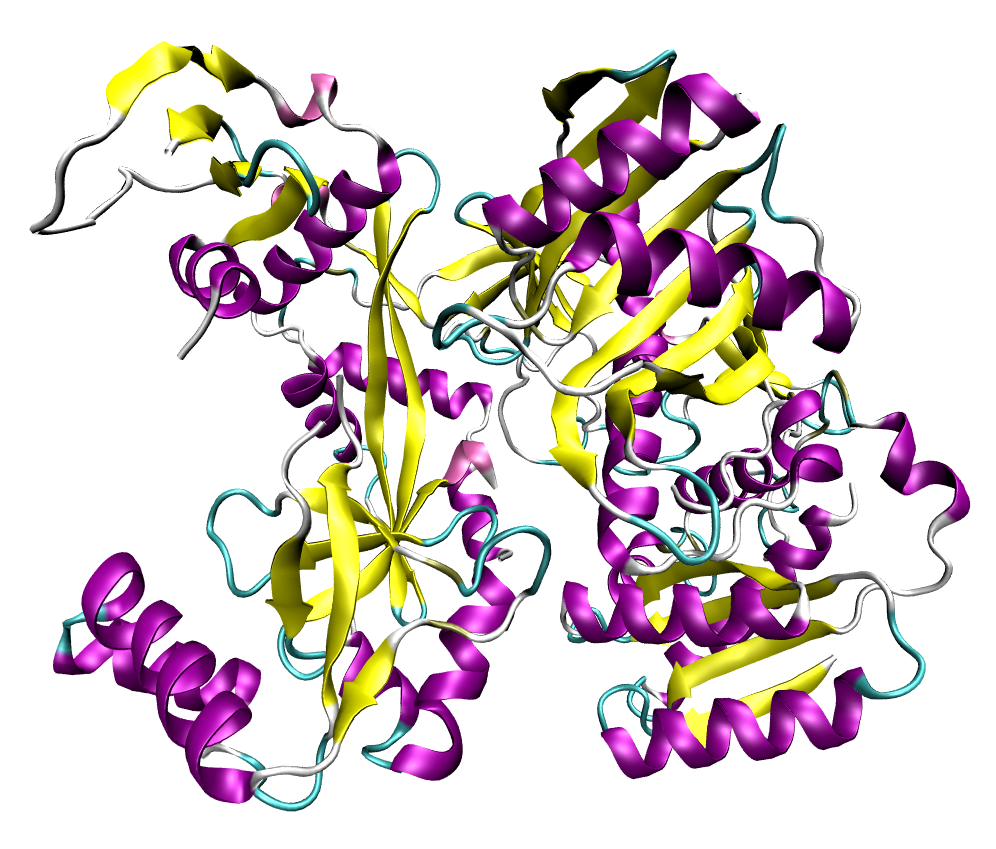
A full-length argonaute protein from the archaea species Pyrococcus furiosus.

Regardless, it is apparent that Argonaute proteins are present and are essential for function. Furthermore, there are insights into some of the key proteins (in addition to Argonaute) within the complex, which allow RISC to carry out its function.

=== Argonaute proteins ===
Argonaute proteins are a family of proteins found in prokaryotes and eukaryotes. Their function in prokaryotes is unknown but in eukaryotes they are responsible for RNAi. There are eight family members in human Argonautes of which only Argonaute 2 is exclusively involved in targeted RNA cleavage in RISC.

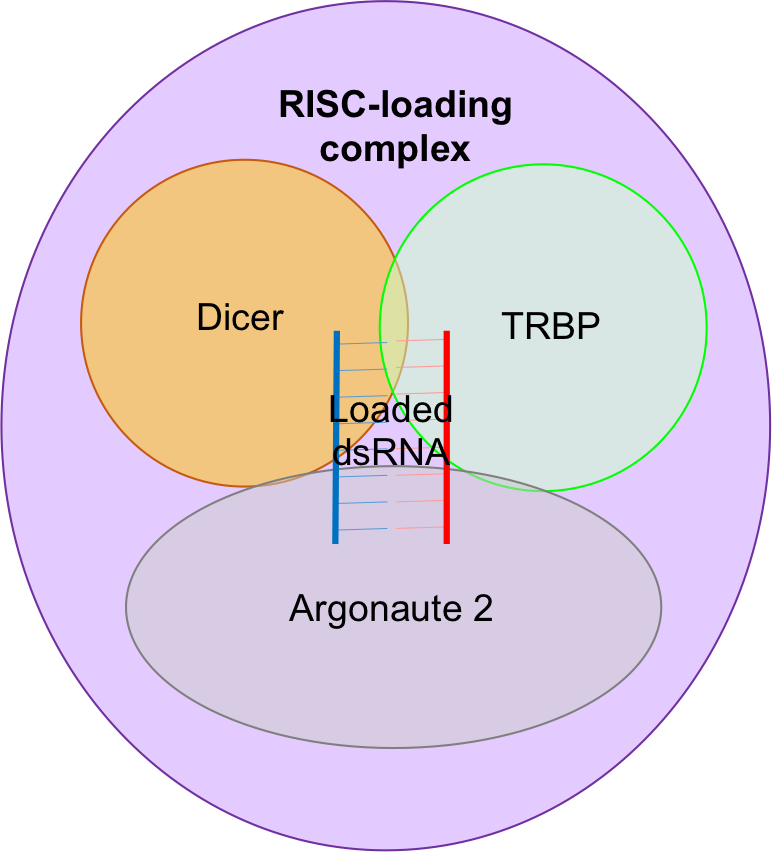
The RISC-loading complex allows the loading of dsRNA fragments (generated by Dicer) to be loaded onto Argonaute 2 (with the help of TRBP) as part of the RNA interference pathway.

=== RISC-loading complex ===
The RISC-loading complex (RLC) is the essential structure required to load dsRNA fragments into RISC in order to target mRNA. The RLC consists of dicer, the transactivating response RNA-binding protein (TRBP) and Argonaute 2.

- Dicer is an RNase III endonuclease which generates the dsRNA fragments to be loaded that direct RNAi.
- TRBP is a protein with three double-stranded RNA-binding domains.
- Argonaute 2 is an RNase and is the catalytic centre of RISC.

Dicer associates with TRBP and Argonaute 2 to facilitate the transfer of the dsRNA fragments generated by Dicer to Argonaute 2.

More recent research has shown the human RNA helicase A could help facilitate the RLC.

=== Other proteins ===
Recently identified members of RISC are SND1 and MTDH. SND1 and MTDH are oncogenes and regulate various gene expression.

Table 2: Biochemically documented proteins associated with RISCBased on the table by Sontheimer (2005)
Protein	Species the protein is found
Dcr1	D. melanogaster
Dcr2	D. melanogaster
R2D2	D. melanogaster
Ago2	D. melanogaster
Dmp68	D. melanogaster
Fmr1/Fxr	D. melanogaster
Tsn	D. melanogaster
Vig	D. melanogaster
Polyribosomes, ribosome components	D. melanogaster, T. brucei
eIF2C1 (Ago1)	H. sapiens
eIF2C2 (Ago2)	H. sapiens
Gemin3	H. sapiens
Gemin4	H. sapiens

Ago, Argonaute; Dcr, Dicer; Dmp68, D. melanogaster orthologue of mammalian p68 RNA unwindase; eIF2C1, eukaryotic translation initiation factor 2C1; eIF2C2, eukaryotic translation initiation factor 2C2; Fmr1/Fxr, D. melanogaster orthologue of the fragile-X mental retardation protein; Tsn, Tudor-staphylococcal nuclease; Vig, vasa intronic gene.

== Binding of mRNA ==
Diagram of RISC activity with miRNAs

It is as yet unclear how the activated RISC complex locates the mRNA targets in the cell, though it has been shown that the process can occur in situations outside of ongoing protein translation from mRNA.

Endogenously expressed miRNA in metazoans is usually not perfectly complementary to a large number of genes and thus, they modulate expression via translational repression. However, in plants, the process has a much greater specificity to target mRNA and usually each miRNA only binds to one mRNA. A greater specificity means mRNA degradation is more likely to occur.

== See also ==
- RNA-induced transcriptional silencing (RITS)
- RNA interference
