= Piwi-interacting RNA =

Largest class of small non-coding RNA molecules in animals

Piwi-interacting RNA (piRNA) is the largest class of small non-coding RNA molecules expressed in animal cells. piRNAs form RNA-protein complexes through interactions with piwi-subfamily Argonaute proteins. These piRNA complexes are mostly involved in the epigenetic and post-transcriptional silencing of transposable elements and other spurious or repeat-derived transcripts, but can also be involved in the regulation of other genetic elements in germ line cells.

piRNAs are mostly created from loci that function as transposon traps which provide a kind of RNA-mediated adaptive immunity against transposon expansions and invasions. They are distinct from microRNA (miRNA) in size (26–31 nucleotides as opposed to 21–24 nt), lack of sequence conservation, increased complexity, and independence of Dicer for biogenesis, at least in animals.

Double-stranded RNAs capable of silencing repeat elements, then known as repeat associated small interfering RNA (rasiRNA), were proposed in Drosophila in 2001. By 2008, it was still unclear how piRNAs are generated, but potential methods had been suggested, and it was certain their biogenesis pathway is distinct from miRNA and siRNA, while rasiRNA is now considered a piRNA subspecies.

== Characteristics ==
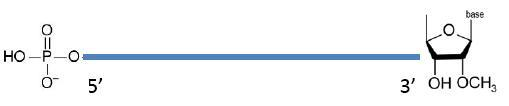
Proposed piRNA structure, with the 3′ end 2′-O-methylation

piRNAs have been identified in both vertebrates and invertebrates, and although biogenesis and modes of action do vary somewhat between species, a number of features are conserved. piRNAs have no clear secondary structure motifs, due to the fact that the length of a piRNA varies between species (from 21 to 31 nucleotides), and the bias for a 5' uridine is common to piRNAs in both vertebrates and invertebrates. piRNAs in Caenorhabditis elegans have a 5' monophosphate and a 3' modification that acts to block either the 2' or 3' oxygen; this has also been confirmed to exist in Drosophila melanogaster, zebrafish, mice, and rats. This 3' modification is a 2'-O-methylation; the reason for this modification is not clear, but it has been suggested that it increases piRNA stability.

More than 50,000 unique piRNA sequences have been discovered in mice and more than 13,000 in D. melanogaster. It is thought that there are many hundreds of thousands of different piRNA species in mammals.

== History and loci ==
In the early 1980s, it was discovered that a single mutation in the fruit fly genome could specifically activate all copies of a retrovirus-like element called Gypsy in the female germline. The site of the mutations that made these Gypsies "dance" was thus called the flamenco locus. In 2001, Aravin et al. proposed that double-stranded (ds) RNA-mediated silencing is implicated in the control of retrotransposons in the germline and by 2003 the idea had emerged that vestiges of transposons might produce dsRNAs required for the silencing of "live" transposons. Sequencing of the 200,000-bp flamenco locus was difficult, as it turned out to be packed with transposable element fragments (104 insertions of 42 different transposons, including multiple Gypsies), all facing the same direction. Indeed, piRNAs are all found in clusters throughout animal genomes; these clusters may contain as few as ten or many thousands of piRNAs matching different, phased transposon fragments. This led to the idea in 2007 that in germlines a pool of primary piRNAs is processed from long single-stranded transcripts encoded by piRNA clusters in the opposite orientation of the transposons, so that the piRNAs can anneal to and complement the transposon-encoded transcripts, thereby triggering their degradation. Any transposon landing in the correct orientation in such a cluster will make the individual more or less immune to that transposon, and such an advantageous mutation will spread quickly through the population. The original mutations in the flamenco locus inhibited the transcription of the master transcript, thereby deactivating this defense system.

A historical example of invasion and Piwi response is known: the P-element transposon invaded a Drosophila melanogaster genome in the mid-20th century, and, through interbreeding, within decades all wild fruit flies worldwide (though not the reproductively isolated lab strains) contained the same P-element. Repression of further P-element activity, spreading near-simultaneously, appears to have occurred by the Piwi-interacting RNA pathway.

piRNA clusters in genomes can now readily be detected via bioinformatics methods. While D. melanogaster and vertebrate piRNAs have been located in areas lacking any protein-coding genes, piRNAs in C. elegans have been identified amidst protein-coding genes.

In mammals, piRNAs are found both in testes and ovaries, although they only seem to be required in males. In invertebrates, piRNAs have been detected in both the male and female germlines.

At the cellular level, piRNAs have been found within both the nucleus and cytoplasm, suggesting that piRNA pathways may function in both of these areas and, therefore, may have multiple effects.

== Classification ==
There are at least three Argonaute (Ago) subfamilies that have been found in eukaryotes. Unlike the Ago subfamily which is present in animals, plants, and fission yeast, the Piwi subfamily has only been found in animals. RasiRNA has been observed in Drosophila and some unicellular eukaryotes but its presence in mammals has not been determined, unlike piRNA which has been observed in many species of invertebrates and vertebrates including mammals; however, since proteins which associate with rasiRNA are found in both vertebrates and invertebrates, it is possible that active rasiRNA exist and have yet to be observed in other animals. RasiRNAs have been observed in Schizosaccharomyces pombe, a species of yeast, as well in some plants, neither of which have been observed to contain the Piwi subfamily of Argonaute proteins. It has been observed that both rasiRNA and piRNA are maternally linked, but more specifically it is the Piwi protein subfamily that is maternally linked and therefore leads to the observation that rasiRNA and piRNA are maternally linked.

== Biogenesis ==
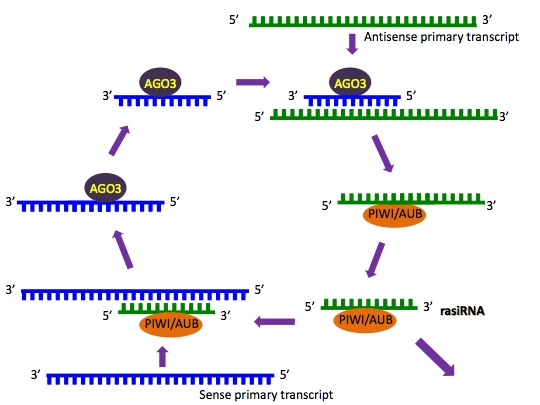
The ping-pong mechanism for the biogenesis of the 5′ end of rasiRNA.

The biogenesis of piRNAs is not yet fully understood, although possible mechanisms have been proposed. piRNAs show a significant strand bias, that is, they are derived from one strand of DNA only, and this may indicate that they are the product of long single stranded precursor molecules. A primary processing pathway is suggested to be the only pathway used to produce pachytene piRNAs; in this mechanism, piRNA precursors are transcribed resulting in piRNAs with a tendency to target 5' uridines. Also proposed is a 'Ping Pong' mechanism wherein primary piRNAs recognise their complementary targets and cause the recruitment of piwi proteins. This results in the cleavage of the transcript at a point ten nucleotides from the 5' end of the primary piRNA, producing the secondary piRNA. These secondary piRNAs are targeted toward sequences that possess an adenine at the tenth position. One or both of these mechanisms may be acting in different species; C. elegans, for instance, does have piRNAs, but does not appear to use the ping pong mechanism at all.

A significant number of piRNAs identified in zebrafish and D. melanogaster contain adenine at their tenth position, and this has been interpreted as possible evidence of a conserved biosynthetic mechanism across species. Ping-pong signatures have been identified in very primitive animals such as sponges and cnidarians, pointing to the existence of the ping-pong cycle already in the early branches of metazoans.

=== Ping Pong ===
The piRNA Ping-Pong pathway was first proposed from studies in Drosophila where the piRNA associated with the two cytoplasmic Piwi proteins, Aubergine (Aub) and Argonaute-3 (Ago3) exhibited a high frequency of sequence complementarity over exactly 10 nucleotides at their 5′ ends. This relationship is known as the "ping-pong signature" and is also observed in associated piRNA from Mili and Miwi2 proteins isolated from mouse testes. The proposed function of Ping-Pong in Drosophila or in mouse remains to be understood, but a leading hypothesis is that the interaction between Aub and Ago3 allows for a cyclic refinement of piRNA that are best suited to target active transposon sequences. Aub piRNA are primarily antisense to transposable element transcripts and are believed to be the main factor in targeting deleterious transcripts through complementarity. Conversely, Ago3 piRNA sequences are predominantly of sense orientation to transposable element transcripts and are derived from the product of Aub cleavage of transposon mRNA. As such, Ago3 piRNA lack the ability to target transposable element transcripts directly. Therefore, it was proposed that Ago3 piRNA guide the production of piRNA that are loaded into Aub by targeting newly exported piRNA cluster transcripts. Several lines of evidence support the effect of Ago3 on the production of Aub piRNA, in particular from examining the piRNA repertoire in Drosophila ovaries that are mutant for Ago3 and the Tudor-domain protein Kumo/Qin.

The molecular mechanism that underpins Ping-Pong likely involves several piRNA pathway associated factors. Qin was reported to coordinate the loading of Ago3 with piRNA, in addition to interacting with both Aub and Ago3. However, the Tudor protein krimper (A1ZAC4) was also shown to interact with both Aub and Ago3 through its Tudor domains while also binding itself through its N-terminal Krimper domain. Specifically, Krimper interacts with Ago3 in its piRNA-unloaded state, while its interaction with Aub is dependent on the symmetrical dimethylation of arginine residues in the N-terminal region of Aub. In Silkmoth germ cells, it was proposed that Vasa protein coordinates the Ping-Pong mechanism of Silkmoth Aub (Siwi) and Ago3.

It is likely that the mechanism of Ping-Pong is primarily coordinated by Krimper but factors such as Kumo/Qin and Vasa, in addition to other factors have necessary functions in the Ping-Pong mechanism.

=== Phased piRNA biogenesis ===
In the Drosophila germline, the cytoplasmic PIWI proteins Aubergine (Aub) and Argonaute 3 (Ago3) participate in ping-pong amplification, whereas piRNAs bound to Piwi can direct transcriptional silencing in the nucleus. Through complementary strategies, two studies show that Aub and Ago3 target cleavage triggers the 'phased' loading of piRNA into Piwi. Phasing begins with the targeting and cleavage of a complementary target by either Aub or Ago3 associated with a 'responder' piRNA. Once cleaved, the targeted transcript is then processed further by a mechanism believed to require the mitochondrial-associated endonuclease, Zucchini, which leads to the loading of Piwi protein with sequential fragments of the targeted transcript. In this way, the Aub or Ago3 'responder' piRNA sequence cleaves a complementary target that is then sliced at periodic intervals of approximately 27 nucleotides that are sequentially loaded into Piwi protein. Thus, "phased" refers to sequential, non-overlapping production from a precursor RNA rather than cleavage at an invariant nucleotide interval.

Once loaded with piRNA, Piwi then enters the germ cell nucleus to co-transcriptionally silence nascent transcripts with complementarity to its piRNA guide.

Phased piRNA production is not restricted to Drosophila. Analysis of untrimmed piRNA intermediates demonstrated phased production of pachytene piRNAs in mice, and comparative analyses identified signatures consistent with PIWI-directed phased processing in diverse animal lineages.

Phased piRNA biogenesis is mechanistically distinct from the production of plant phased small interfering RNAs (phasiRNAs). Plant trans-acting small interfering RNAs were identified in 2004, and their phased processing was demonstrated in 2005, before piRNAs were named and characterized as a distinct PIWI-associated small-RNA class in 2006. Plant phasiRNAs are produced from double-stranded RNA by Dicer-like proteins, whereas piRNAs are generated from single-stranded precursors through Dicer-independent pathways.

== Function ==
The wide variation in piRNA sequences and piwi function across species contributes to the difficulty in establishing the functionality of piRNAs. However, like other small RNAs, piRNAs are thought to be involved in gene silencing, specifically the silencing of transposons. The majority of piRNAs are antisense to transposon sequences, suggesting that transposons are targets of the piRNAs. In mammals, it appears that the activity of piRNAs in transposon silencing is most important during the development of the embryo, and in both C. elegans and humans, piRNAs are necessary for spermatogenesis.

=== RNA silencing ===
piRNA has a role in RNA silencing via the formation of an RNA-induced silencing complex (RISC). piRNAs interact with piwi proteins that are part of a family of proteins called the Argonautes. These are active in the testes of mammals and are required for germ-cell and stem-cell development in invertebrates. Three piwi subfamily proteins – MIWI, MIWI2, and MILI – have been found to be essential for spermatogenesis in mice. piRNAs direct the piwi proteins to their transposon targets. A decrease or absence of PIWI gene expression is correlated with an increased expression of transposons. Transposons have a high potential to cause deleterious effects on their hosts and, in fact, mutations in piRNA pathways have been found to reduce fertility in D. melanogaster. Further, it is thought that piRNA and endogenous small interfering RNA (endo-siRNA) may have comparable and even redundant functionality in transposon control in mammalian oocytes.

piRNAs appear to affect particular methyltransferases that perform the methylations which are required to recognise and silence transposons, but this relationship is not well understood.

=== Antiviral effects ===
In Dipterans viral-derived piRNAs derived from positive-sense RNA viruses were first identified in Drosophila ovarian somatic sheet (OSS) cells. Subsequent experimental studies have demonstrated that the piRNA pathway is not required for antiviral defence in Drosophila melanogaster. However, in mosquitoes the PIWI family of proteins has expanded and some PIWI proteins have been identified as antiviral such as Piwi4. As such virus infections in mosquitoes commonly produce virus-derived piRNAs in diverse positive-sense RNA, negative-sense RNA and single-stranded DNA viruses.

=== Epigenetic effects ===
piRNAs can be transmitted maternally, and based on research in D. melanogaster, piRNAs may be involved in maternally derived epigenetic effects. The activity of specific piRNAs in the epigenetic process also requires interactions between piwi proteins and HP1a, as well as other factors.

== Accessory proteins of the piRNA pathway ==
Genetic screens examining fertility defects identified a number of proteins that are not Piwi-clade Argonautes, yet produce the same sterility phenotypes as Piwi mutants.

=== Drosophila Tudor domain proteins ===
Many factors required for the piRNA pathway in Drosophila contain Tudor domains that are known to bind symmetrically dimethylated arginine residues (sDMA) present in methylation motifs of Piwi proteins. Piwi proteins are symmetrically dimethylated by the PRMT5 methylosome complex, consisting of Valois (MEP50) and Capsulèen (dart5; PRMT5).

- Tudor (Tud)
- Qin/Kumo
- Spindle-E (SpnE)
- Krimper
- Tejas (Tej)
- Vreteno (Vret)
- Papi
- Yb (fs(1)Yb)
- Brother of Yb (BoYB)
- Sister of Yb (SoYB)

=== Non-Tudor Drosophila piRNA pathway proteins ===
- Vasa
- Maelstrom (Mael)

=== Drosophila nuclear piRNA pathway proteins ===
- Rhino (HP1D)
- Deadlock
- Cutoff
- SetDB1 (Eggless)
- SuVar3–9

== Investigation ==
Major advances in the study of piRNA have been achieved thanks to the use of next-generation sequencing techniques, such as Solexa, 454, and Illumina platform sequencing. These techniques allow analysis of highly complex and heterogeneous RNA populations like piRNAs. Due to their small size, expression and amplification of small RNAs can be challenging, so specialised PCR-based methods have been developed in response to this difficulty. However, research has also revealed that a number of annotated piRNAs may be false positives; for instance, a majority of piRNAs that were expressed in somatic non-gonadal tissues were considered to derive from non-coding RNA fragments.
