= Piwi =

Genes and regulatory proteins

Piwi domain
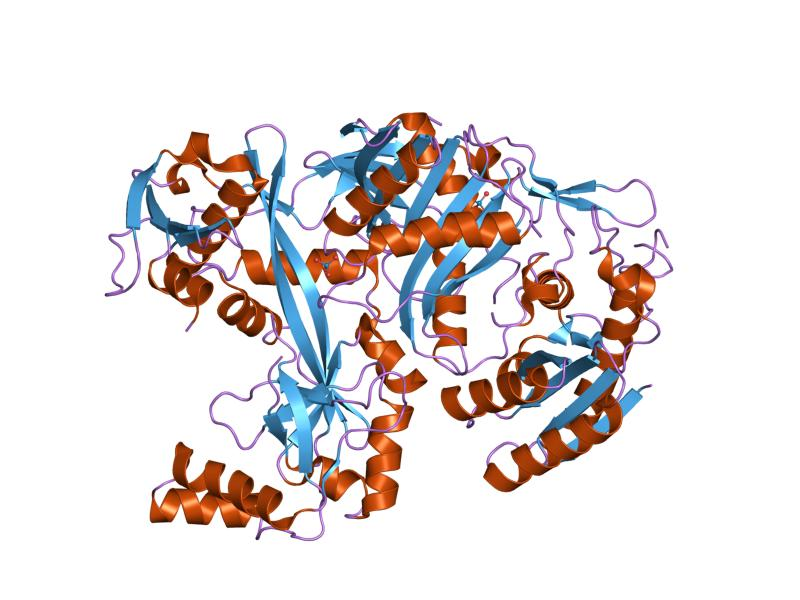
- Structure of the Pyrococcus furiosus Argonaute protein.

Identifiers
- Symbol: Piwi
- Pfam: PF02171
- InterPro: IPR003165
- PROSITE: PS50822
- CDD: cd02826
Available protein structures:
- PDB: 1u04, 1w9h, 1ytu, 1yvu, 1z25, 1z26, 2bgg, 2f8s, 2f8t, 2nub, 2w42 IPR003165 PF02171 (ECOD; PDBsum)
- AlphaFold: IPR003165; PF02171

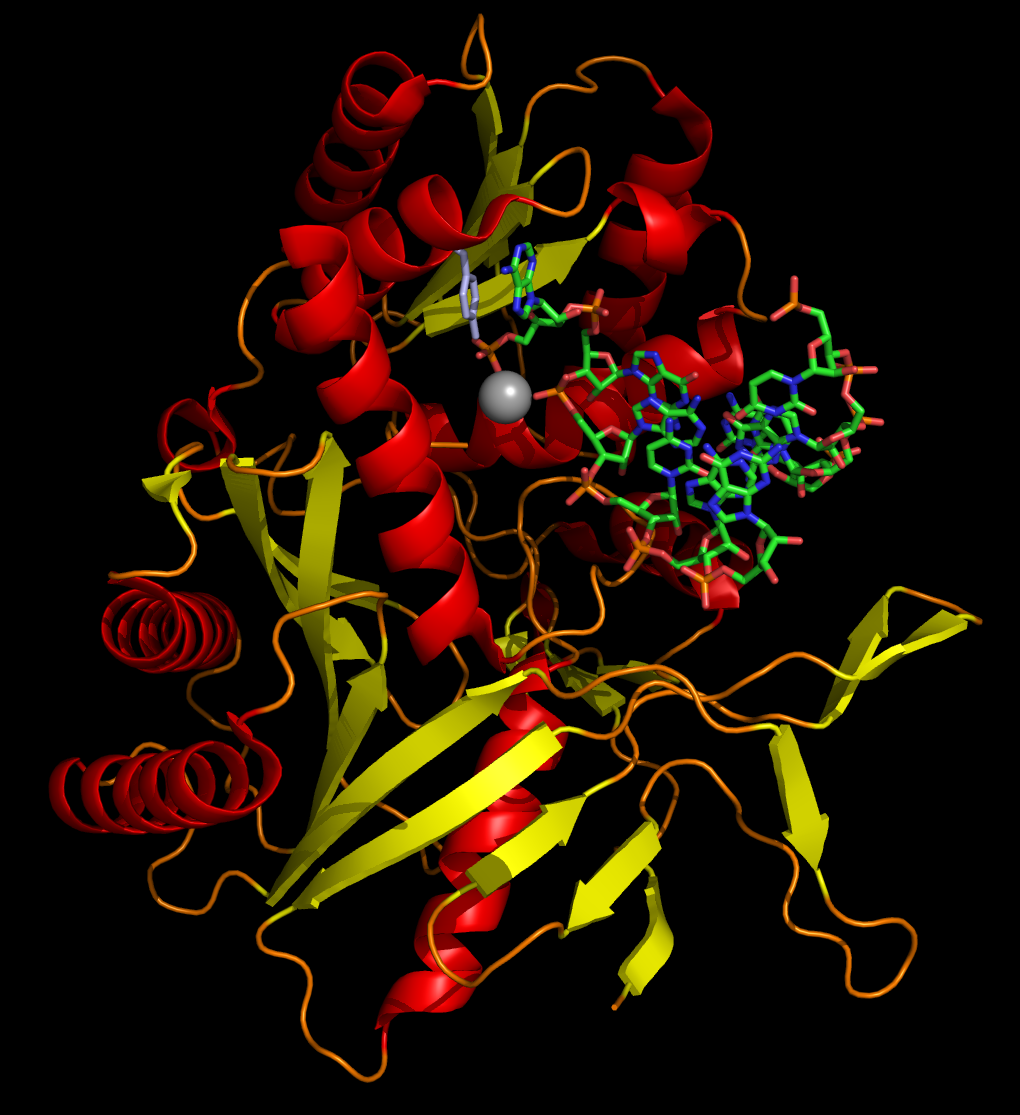
The piwi domain of an argonaute protein with bound siRNA, components of the RNA-induced silencing complex that mediates gene silencing by RNA interference.

All human Piwi proteins and argonaute proteins have the same RNA binding domains, PAZ and Piwi.

Piwi-piRNA interactions: Within the nucleus, this pathway is involved in DNA methylation (A), histone methylation of H3K9 through interactions with heterochromatin protein 1 (HP1) and H3K9 histone methyltransferase (B). The Piwi-piRNA pathway also interacts with the elF translational initiator (C).

Piwi (or PIWI) genes were identified as regulatory proteins responsible for stem cell and germ cell differentiation. Piwi is an abbreviation of P-element Induced WImpy testis (Note: The word Wimpy itself comes from White color of eyes and Impotency [or profound infertility]. Y is added as a suffix to form a more pronounceable and coherent word.) in Drosophila. Piwi proteins are highly conserved RNA-binding proteins and are present in both plants and animals. Piwi proteins belong to the Argonaute/Piwi family and have been classified as nuclear proteins. Studies on Drosophila have also indicated that Piwi proteins have no slicer activity conferred by the presence of the Piwi domain. In addition, Piwi associates with heterochromatin protein 1, an epigenetic modifier, and piRNA-complementary sequences. These are indications of the role Piwi plays in epigenetic regulation. Piwi proteins are also thought to control the biogenesis of piRNA as many Piwi-like proteins contain slicer activity which would allow Piwi proteins to process precursor piRNA into mature piRNA.

== Protein structure and function ==
The structure of several Piwi and Argonaute proteins (Ago) have been solved. Piwi proteins are RNA-binding proteins with 2 or 3 domains: The N-terminal PAZ domain binds the 3'-end of the guide RNA; the middle MID domain binds the 5'-phosphate of RNA; and the C-terminal PIWI domain acts as an RNase H endonuclease that can cleave RNA. The small RNA partners of Ago proteins are microRNAs (miRNAs). Ago proteins utilize miRNAs to silence genes post-transcriptionally or use small-interfering RNAs (siRNAs) in both transcription and post-transcription silencing mechanisms. Piwi proteins interact with piRNAs (28–33 nucleotides) that are longer than miRNAs and siRNAs (~20 nucleotides), suggesting that their functions are distinct from those of Ago proteins.

== Human Piwi proteins ==
Presently there are four known human Piwi proteins—PIWI-like protein 1, PIWI-like protein 2, PIWI-like protein 3 and PIWI-like protein 4. Human Piwi proteins all contain two RNA binding domains, PAZ and Piwi. The four PIWI-like proteins have a spacious binding site within the PAZ domain which allows them to bind the bulky 2’-OCH3 at the 3’ end of piwi-interacting RNA.

One of the major human homologues, whose upregulation is implicated in the formation of tumours such as seminomas, is called hiwi (for human piwi).

Homologous proteins in mice have been called miwi (for mouse piwi).

== Role in germline cells ==
PIWI proteins play a crucial role in fertility and germline development across animals and ciliates. Recently identified as a polar granule component, PIWI proteins appear to control germ cell formation so much so that in the absence of PIWI proteins there is a significant decrease in germ cell formation. Similar observations were made with the mouse homologs of PIWI, MILI, MIWI and MIWI2. These homologs are known to be present in spermatogenesis. Miwi is expressed in various stages of spermatocyte formation and spermatid elongation where Miwi2 is expressed in Sertoli cells. Mice deficient in either Mili or Miwi-2 have experienced spermatogenic stem cell arrest and those lacking Miwi-2 underwent a degradation of spermatogonia. The effects of piwi proteins in human and mouse germlines seems to stem from their involvement in translation control as Piwi and the small noncoding RNA, piwi-interacting RNA (piRNA), have been known to co-fractionate polysomes. The piwi-piRNA pathway also induces heterochromatin formation at centromeres, thus affecting transcription. The piwi-piRNA pathway also appears to protect the genome. First observed in Drosophila, mutant piwi-piRNA pathways led to a direct increase in dsDNA breaks in ovarian germ cells. The role of the piwi-piRNA pathway in transposon silencing may be responsible for the reduction in dsDNA breaks in germ cells.

== Role in RNA interference ==
The piwi domain is a protein domain found in piwi proteins and a large number of related nucleic acid-binding proteins, especially those that bind and cleave RNA. The function of the domain is double stranded-RNA-guided hydrolysis of single stranded-RNA that has been determined in the argonaute family of related proteins. Argonautes, the most well-studied family of nucleic-acid binding proteins, are RNase H-like enzymes that carry out the catalytic functions of the RNA-induced silencing complex (RISC). In the well-known cellular process of RNA interference, the argonaute protein in the RISC complex can bind both small interfering RNA (siRNA) generated from exogenous double-stranded RNA and microRNA (miRNA) generated from endogenous non-coding RNA, both produced by the ribonuclease Dicer, to form an RNA-RISC complex. This complex binds and cleaves complementary base pairing messenger RNA, destroying it and preventing its translation into protein. Crystallised piwi domains have a conserved basic binding site for the 5' end of bound RNA; in the case of argonaute proteins binding siRNA strands, the last unpaired nucleotide base of the siRNA is also stabilised by base stacking-interactions between the base and neighbouring tyrosine residues.

Recent evidence suggests that the functional role of piwi proteins in germ-line determination is due to their capacity to interact with miRNAs. Components of the miRNA pathway appear to be present in pole plasm and to play a key role in early development and morphogenesis of Drosophila melanogaster embryos, in which germ-line maintenance has been extensively studied.

== piRNAs and transposon silencing ==
A novel class of longer-than-average miRNAs known as Piwi-interacting RNAs (piRNAs) has been defined in mammalian cells, about 26-31 nucleotides long as compared to the more typical miRNA or siRNA of about 21 nucleotides. These piRNAs are expressed mainly in spermatogenic cells in the testes of mammals. But studies have reported that piRNA expression can be found in the ovarian somatic cells and neuron cells in invertebrates, as well as in many other mammalian somatic cells. piRNAs have been identified in the genomes of mice, rats, and humans, with an unusual "clustered" genomic organization that may originate from repetitive regions of the genome such as retrotransposons or regions normally organized into heterochromatin, and which are normally derived exclusively from the antisense strand of double-stranded RNA. piRNAs have thus been classified as repeat-associated small interfering RNAs (rasiRNAs).

Although their biogenesis is not yet well understood, piRNAs and Piwi proteins are thought to form an endogenous system for silencing the expression of selfish genetic elements such as retrotransposons and thus preventing the gene products of such sequences from interfering with germ cell formation.
