= Argonaute =

Protein that plays a role in RNA silencing process

Argonaute Piwi domain
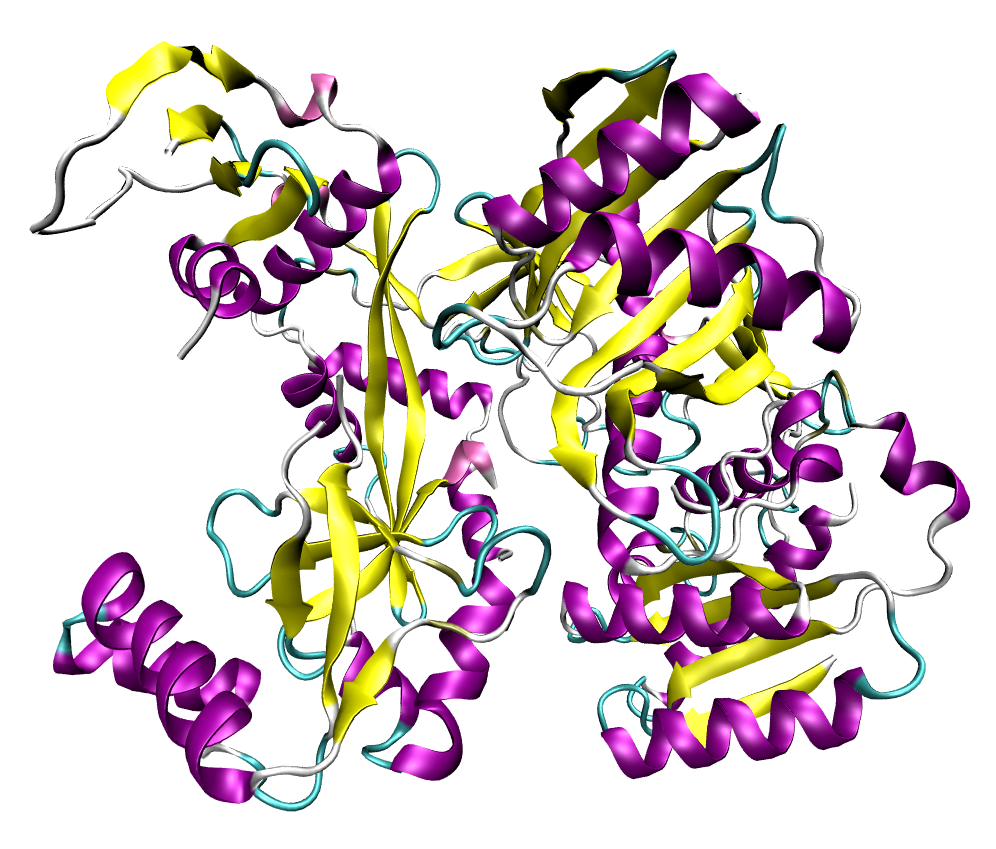
- An argonaute protein from Pyrococcus furiosus. PDB 1U04. PIWI domain is on the right, PAZ domain to the left.

Identifiers
- Symbol: Piwi
- Pfam: PF02171
- InterPro: IPR003165
- PROSITE: PS50822
- CDD: cd02826
Available protein structures:
- PDB: IPR003165 PF02171 (ECOD; PDBsum)
- AlphaFold: IPR003165; PF02171

The Argonaute protein family, first discovered for its evolutionarily conserved stem cell function, plays a central role in RNA silencing processes as essential components of the RNA-induced silencing complex (RISC). RISC is responsible for the gene silencing phenomenon known as RNA interference (RNAi). Argonaute proteins bind different classes of small non-coding RNAs, including microRNAs (miRNAs), small interfering RNAs (siRNAs) and piwi-interacting RNAs (piRNAs). Small RNAs guide Argonaute proteins to their specific targets through sequence complementarity (base pairing), which then leads to mRNA cleavage, translation inhibition, and/or the initiation of mRNA decay.

The name of this protein family is derived from a mutant phenotype resulting from mutation of AGO1 in Arabidopsis thaliana, which was likened by Bohmert et al. to the appearance of the pelagic octopus Argonauta argo.

Argonaute Paz domain

Identifiers
- Symbol: Paz
- Pfam: PF12212
- InterPro: IPR021103
- SCOP2: b.34.14.1 / SCOPe / SUPFAM
Available protein structures:
- PDB: IPR021103 PF12212 (ECOD; PDBsum)
- AlphaFold: IPR021103; PF12212

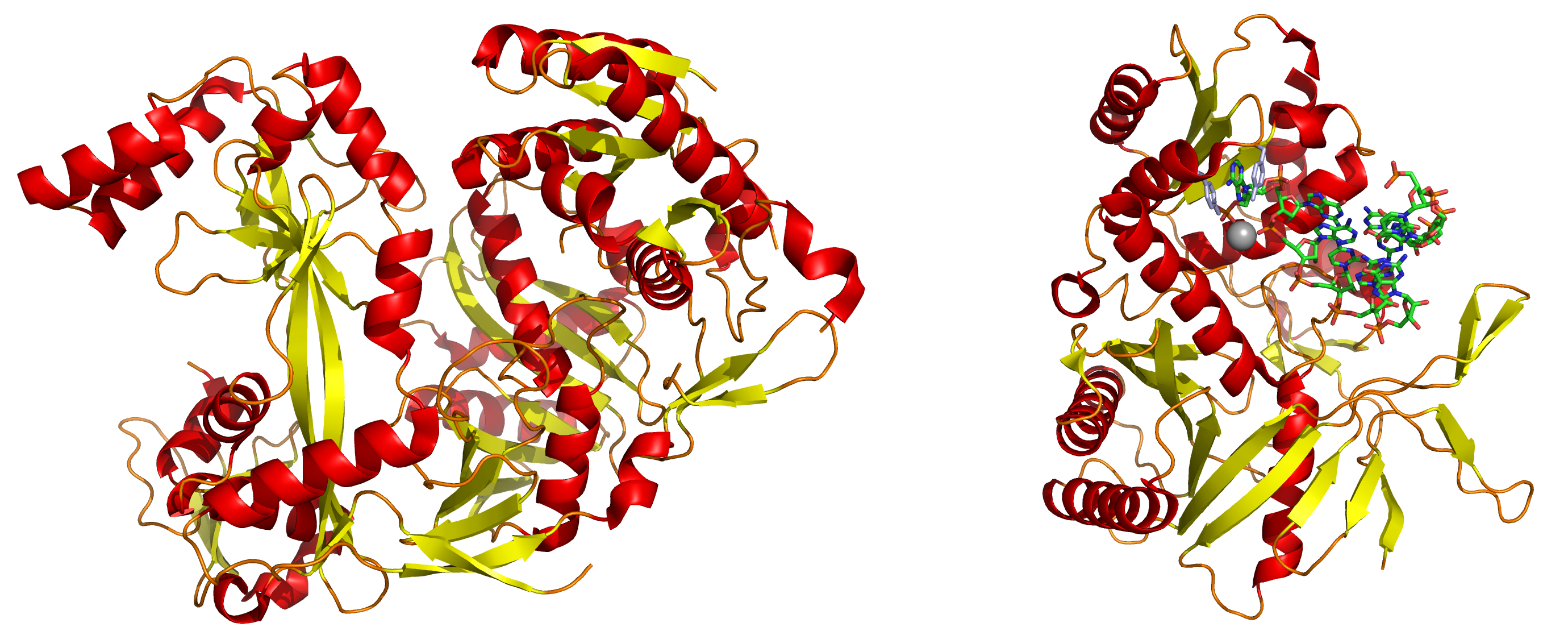
Left: A full-length argonaute protein from the archaea species Pyrococcus furiosus.PDB 1U04. Right: The PIWI domain of an argonaute protein in complex with double-stranded RNA PDB 1YTU. The base-stacking interaction between the 5′ base on the guide strand and a conserved tyrosine residue (light blue) is highlighted; the stabilizing divalent cation (magnesium) is shown as a gray sphere.

Lentiviral delivery of designed shRNA's and the mechanism of RNA interference in mammalian cells.

== RNA interference ==
RNA interference (RNAi) is a biological process in which RNA molecules inhibit gene expression, via either destruction of specific mRNA molecules or suppressing translation. RNAi has a significant role in defending cells against parasitic nucleotide sequences. In eukaryotes, including animals, RNAi is initiated by the enzyme Dicer. Dicer cleaves long double-stranded RNA (dsRNA, often found in viruses and small interfering RNA) molecules into short double stranded fragments of around 20 nucleotide siRNAs. The dsRNA is then separated into two single-stranded RNAs (ssRNA) – the passenger strand and the guide strand. Subsequently, the passenger strand is degraded, while the guide strand is incorporated into the RNA-induced silencing complex (RISC). The most well-studied outcome of the RNAi is post-transcriptional gene silencing, which occurs when the guide strand pairs with a complementary sequence in a messenger RNA molecule and induces cleavage by Argonaute, that lies in the core of RNA-induced silencing complex.

Argonaute proteins are the active part of RNA-induced silencing complex, cleaving the target mRNA strand complementary to their bound siRNA. Theoretically the dicer produces short double-stranded fragments so there should be also two functional single-stranded siRNA produced. But only one of the two single-stranded RNA here will be utilized to base pair with target mRNA. It is known as the guide strand, which is incorporated into the Argonaute protein and leads gene silencing. The other single-stranded RNA, named the passenger strand, is degraded during the RNA-induced silencing complex process.

Once the Argonaute is associated with the small RNA, the enzymatic activity conferred by the PIWI domain cleaves only the passenger strand of the small interfering RNA. RNA strand separation and incorporation into the Argonaute protein are guided by the strength of the hydrogen bond interaction at the 5′-ends of the RNA duplex, known as the asymmetry rule. Also the degree of complementarity between the two strands of the intermediate RNA duplex defines how the miRNA are sorted into different types of Argonaute proteins.

In animals, Argonaute associated with miRNA binds to the 3′-untranslated region of mRNA and prevents the production of proteins in various ways. The recruitment of Argonaute proteins to targeted mRNA can induce mRNA degradation. The Argonaute-miRNA complex can also affect the formation of functional ribosomes at the 5′-end of the mRNA. The complex here competes with the translation initiation factors and/or abrogate ribosome assembly. Also, the Argonaute-miRNA complex can adjust protein production by recruiting cellular factors such as peptides or post translational modifying enzymes, which degrade the growing of polypeptides.

In plants, once de novo double-stranded (ds) RNA duplexes are generated with the target mRNA, an unknown RNase-III-like enzyme produces new siRNAs, which are then loaded onto the Argonaute proteins containing PIWI domains, lacking the catalytic amino acid residues, which might induce another level of specific gene silencing.

== Functional domains and mechanism ==
The Argonaute (AGO) gene family encodes six characteristic domains: N- terminal (N), Linker-1 (L1), PAZ, Linker-2 (L2), Mid, and a C-terminal PIWI domain.

The PAZ domain is named for Drosophila Piwi, Arabidopsis Argonaute-1, and Arabidopsis Zwille (also known as pinhead, and later renamed argonaute-10), where the domain was first recognized to be conserved. The PAZ domain is an RNA binding module that recognizes single-stranded 3′ ends of siRNA, miRNA and piRNA, in a sequence independent manner.

PIWI is named after the Drosophila Piwi protein. Structurally resembling RNaseH, the PIWI domain is essential for the target cleavage. The active site with aspartate–aspartate–glutamate triad harbors a divalent metal ion, necessary for the catalysis. Family members of AGO that lost this conserved feature during evolution lack the cleavage activity. In human AGO, the PIWI motif also mediates protein-protein interaction at the PIWI box, where it binds to Dicer at an RNase III domain.

At the interface of PIWI and Mid domains sits the 5′ phosphate of a siRNA, miRNA or piRNA, which is found essential in the functionality. Within Mid lies a MC motif, a homologue structure proposed to mimic the cap-binding structure motif found in eIF4E. It was later found that the MC motif is not involved in mRNA cap binding

== Family members ==
AGO2 (grey) in complex with a microRNA (light blue) and its target mRNA (dark blue)

In humans, there are eight AGO family members, some of which are investigated intensively. However, even though AGO1–4 are capable of loading miRNA, endonuclease activity and thus RNAi-dependent gene silencing exclusively belongs to AGO2. Considering the sequence conservation of PAZ and PIWI domains across the family, the uniqueness of AGO2 is presumed to arise from either the N-terminus or the spacing region linking PAZ and PIWI motifs.

Several AGO family members in plants also attract study. AGO1 is involved in miRNA related RNA degradation, and plays a central role in morphogenesis. In some organisms, it is strictly required for epigenetic silencing. It is regulated by miRNA itself. AGO4 does not involve in RNAi directed RNA degradation, but in DNA methylation and other epigenetic regulation, through small RNA (smRNA) pathway. AGO10 is involved in plant development. AGO7 has a function distinct from AGO 1 and 10, and is not found in gene silencing induced by transgenes. Instead, it is related to developmental timing in plants.

== Disease and therapeutic tools ==
Argonaute proteins were reported to be associated with cancers. For the diseases that are involved with selective or elevated expression of particular identified genes, such as pancreatic cancer, the high sequence specificity of RNA interference might make it suitable to be a suitable treatment, particularly appropriate for combating cancers associated with mutated endogenous gene sequences. It has been reported several tiny non-coding RNAs(microRNAs) are related with human cancers, like miR-15a and miR-16a are frequently deleted and/or down-regulated in patients. Even though the biological functions of miRNAs are not fully understood, the roles for miRNAs in the coordination of cell proliferation and cell death during development and metabolism have been uncovered. It is trusted that the miRNAs can direct negative or positive regulation at different levels, which depends on the specific miRNAs and target base pair interaction and the cofactors that recognize them.

Because it has been widely known that many viruses have RNA rather than DNA as their genetic material and go through at least one stage in their life cycle when they make double-stranded RNA, RNA interference has been considered to be a potentially evolutionarily ancient mechanism for protecting organisms from viruses. The small interfering RNAs produced by Dicer cause sequence specific, post-transcriptional gene silencing by guiding an endonuclease, the RNA-induced silencing complex (RISC), to mRNA. This process has been seen in a wide range of organisms, such as Neurospora fungus (in which it is known as quelling), plants (post-transcriptional gene silencing) and mammalian cells(RNAi). If there is a complete or near complete sequence complementarity between the small RNA and the target, the Argonaute protein component of RISC mediates cleavage of the target transcript, the mechanism involves repression of translation predominantly.

== Biotechnological applications of prokaryotic Argonaute proteins ==
In 2016, a group from Hebei University of Science and Technology reported genome editing using a prokaryotic Argonaute protein from Natronobacterium gregoryi. However, evidence for application of Argonaute proteins as DNA-guided nucleases for genome editing have been questioned, with the retraction of the claim from the leading journal. In 2017, a group from University of Illinois reported using a prokaryotic Argonaute protein taken from Pyrococcus furiosus (PfAgo) along with guide DNA to edit DNA in vitro as artificial restriction enzymes. PfAgo based artificial restriction enzymes were also used for storing data on native DNA sequences via enzymatic nicking.
