= SND1 =

Protein and coding gene in humans

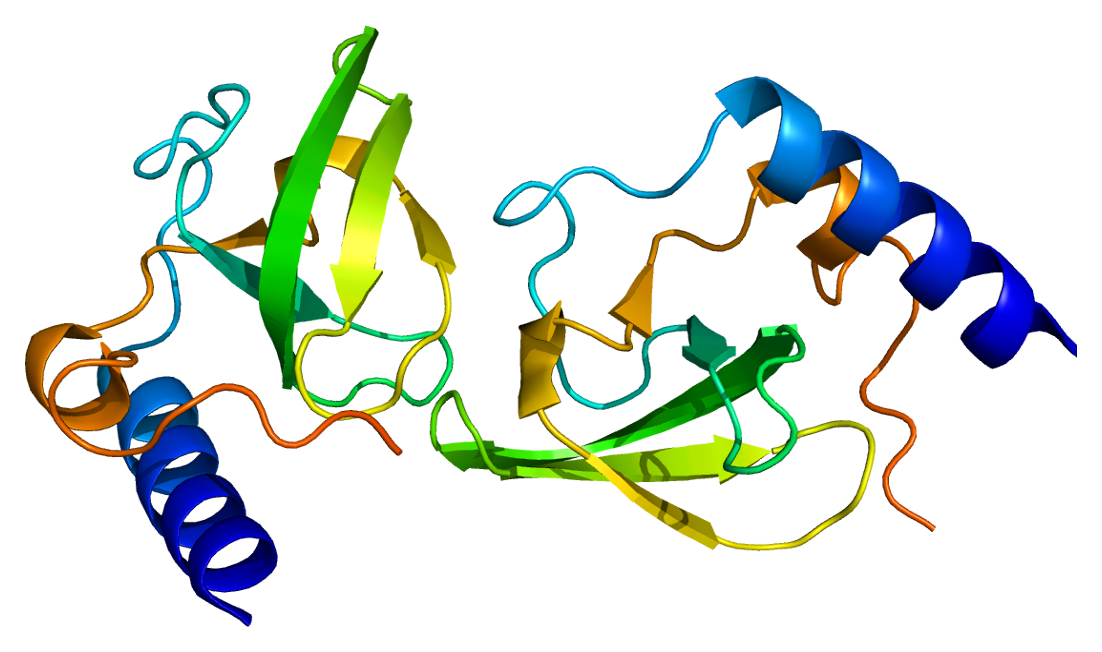

Identifiers
- Aliases: SND1, TDRD11, p100, staphylococcal nuclease and tudor domain containing 1, Tudor-SN
- External IDs: OMIM: 602181; MGI: 1929266; GeneCards: SND1
Available structures
PDB	Ortholog search: PDBe RCSB
PDB	List of PDB id codes 2E6N, 2HQE, 2HQX, 2O4X, 3BDL, 3OMC, 3OMG, 4QMG
Enzyme activity
EC #	BRENDA	ExPASy	KEGG	MetaCyc
3.1.31.1	↗	↗	↗	↗

Gene location (Human)
Chr.	Chromosome 7 (human)
Band	7q32.1	Start	127,652,194 bp
Band	7q32.1	End	128,092,609 bp

Gene location (Mouse)
Chr.	Chromosome 6 (mouse)
Band	6|6 A3.3	Start	28,475,138 bp
Band	6|6 A3.3	End	28,935,161 bp
RNA expression pattern
Bgee	Human / Mouse (ortholog); Top expressed in: body of pancreas; stromal cell of endometrium; islet of Langerhans; parotid gland; epithelium of colon; canal of the cervix; left ovary; smooth muscle tissue; anterior pituitary; right ovary / Top expressed in: lacrimal gland; parotid gland; dentate gyrus of hippocampal formation granule cell; yolk sac; lip; epiblast; ventricular zone; molar; stroma of bone marrow; placenta; More reference expression data
BioGPS	n/a
Gene ontology
Molecular function	protein binding; transcription coregulator activity; nucleic acid binding; nuclease activity; RNA binding; cadherin binding; endonuclease activity; endoribonuclease activity; hydrolase activity; RISC complex binding
Cellular component	melanosome; RISC complex; extracellular exosome; mitochondrion; membrane; dense body; cytoplasm; cytosol; nucleus
Biological process	gene silencing; viral process; regulation of transcription, DNA-templated; osteoblast differentiation; transcription, DNA-templated; nucleic acid phosphodiester bond hydrolysis; RNA catabolic process; regulation of cell cycle process; miRNA catabolic process; RNA phosphodiester bond hydrolysis, endonucleolytic; regulation of nucleic acid-templated transcription
Sources:Amigo / QuickGO
Orthologs
Databases	NCBI: entry; OMA: entry
Species	Human	Mouse
Entrez	27044	56463
Ensembl	ENSG00000197157	ENSMUSG00000001424
UniProt	Q7KZF4	Q78PY7
RefSeq (mRNA)	NM_014390	NM_019776
RefSeq (protein)	NP_055205	NP_062750
Location (UCSC)	Chr 7: 127.65 – 128.09 Mb	Chr 6: 28.48 – 28.94 Mb
PubMed search
- Wikidata
View/Edit Human	View/Edit Mouse

Staphylococcal nuclease domain-containing protein 1 also known as 100 kDa coactivator or Tudor domain-containing protein 11 (TDRD11) is a protein that in humans is encoded by the SND1 gene. SND1 is a main component of RISC complex and plays an important role in miRNA function. SND1 is Tudor domain containing protein and Tudor Proteins are highly conserved proteins and even present in Drosophila melanogaster. SND1 is also involved in Autism.

== Clinical significance ==
SND1 acts as oncogene in many cancers and in hepatocellular carcinoma progression. SND1 promotes tumor angiogenesis in human hepatocellular carcinoma through a novel pathway which involves NF-kappaB and miR-221. SND1 promotes migration and invasion via angiotensin II type 1 receptor and TGFβ signaling. SND1 expression is regulated by Mir-184 in gliomas.

== Interactions ==
SND1 has been shown to interact with MYB,

- PIM1, POLR2A, RBPJ, and STAT6.

SND1 also interacts with G3BP (stress granule protein) and AEG-1.
