= MiR-324-5p =

Type of microRNA

miR-324-5p is a microRNA that functions in cell growth, apoptosis, cancer, epilepsy, neuronal differentiation, psychiatric conditions, cardiac disease pathology, and more. As a microRNA, it regulates gene expression through targeting mRNAs. Additionally, miR-324-5p is both an intracellular miRNA, meaning it is commonly found within the microenvironment of the cell, and one of several circulating miRNAs found throughout the body. Its presence throughout the body both within and external to cells may contribute to miR-324-5p's wide array of functions and role in numerous disease pathologies – especially cancer – in various organ systems.

== History ==
miR-324-5p first appeared in literature in a paper published by John Kim et al. in early 2004 that identified 32 entirely new miRNAs from cultured rat cortical neurons using miRNA cloning and RNA analysis. The miRNA quickly gained traction in scientific literature, appearing in articles about the evolutionary conservation of microRNAs, HIV, cancer, and other topics within a few years. Today, the functions and roles of miR-324-5p are still not yet fully characterized.

== Structure and targets ==
miR-324-5p is a reverse strand miRNA, meaning it is produced from the 5' end of the associated RNA, and spans from position 7,223,342 to 7,223,364 on chromosome 17. Its sequence is CGCAUCCCCUAGGGCAUUGGUG.

miRNA forms following cleavage of pre-miRNA at the hairpin loop by the enzyme dicer within the cytosol. Interestingly, both strands of miR-324's pre-miRNA hairpin loop structure, miR-324-5p and miR-324-3p, become active miRNAs with distinct targets and functions. miR-324-5p has between 166 and 469 predicted targets, including regulators of cell growth, proliferation, survival, cytoskeletal structure, ATP transport, and ion channels. Though miR-324-5p is found on chromosome 17, its targets span across all chromosomes.

== Functions ==
=== Cell growth and survival ===
miR-324-5p likely regulates cell growth and survival through interaction with multiple pathways. Published research demonstrates that this miRNA interacts with the Hedgehog (HH) signaling pathway via interactions with HH transcription factor Gli1 and HH protein receptor Smo, often contributing to tumorigenesis. miR-324-5p's activating interaction with the protein NfkB also regulates numerous components of cell survival, including cell cycle control, enzyme synthesis, and cell adhesion. In addition, miR-324-5p regulates components of the MAPK pathway, influencing cell growth, proliferation, and survival. Specifically, miR-324-5p downregulates RAF and ERK and is necessary for normal levels of cell growth. Reduced expression leads to increased cell growth and proliferation, and overexpression limits growth, leading to its role in oncogenesis.

miRNA-324-5p targets multiple oncogenes, contributing to both tumorigenesis and tumor suppression in different cancers.

=== Cancer ===
Both up and downregulation of miR-324-5p is shown to contribute to various types of cancer.

miR-324-5p plays a role in inflammation and tumorigenesis in colorectal cancer through regulation of CUEDC2, which regulates inflammation via interaction with NF-kB signaling. miR-324-5p can inhibit glioma proliferation, suppress hepatocellular carcinoma and nasopharyngeal carcinoma cell invasion, and regulate growth and pathology in multiple myeloma. Additionally, chromosome 17 deletions, which include deletion of miR-324-5p, are present in 10% of multiple myeloma patients and are associated with poorer prognosis.

In contrast, overexpression of miR-324-5p in gastric cancer cells reduces cell death and promotes growth and proliferation. miR-324-5p has also been shown to reduce the viability of gastric cancer cells via downregulation of TSPAN8, and miR-324-5p expression increased apoptosis in these same gastric cancer cells.

=== Epilepsy ===
Seizures are characterized by high levels of synchronized neuronal activity. One important regulator of neuronal activity is the hyperpolarizing A-type current mediated by potassium channel KV4.2. miR-324-5p downregulates KV4.2, exacerbating conditions that lead to seizure onset, and downregulation of miR-324-5p in mouse models of epilepsy is seizure-suppressive.

Changes in miRNA expression are seen in epileptogenesis and in other disease pathologies. In epilepsy, miR-324-5p expression has been shown to increase and decrease at different timepoints and loci.

Importantly, miR-324-5p has increased association with the RISC complex following seizure in mice, indicating more suppressive activity.

Overall, this suggests that miR-324-5p plays a role in epileptogenesis via targeting of potassium channel KV4.2.

=== Cardiac disease ===
miR-324-5p contributes to cardiac disease pathophysiology and cardiomyocite death through translational inhibition of Mtfr1, leading to reduced mitochondrial fission, apoptosis, and myocardial infarction.

=== Psychiatric conditions ===
MiRNA expression profiles are altered in psychiatric conditions, including depression, anxiety, and PTSD. It has been demonstrated that miR-324-5p expression is altered in the brains of suicide victims with depression and in the amygdala, the fear center of the brain, in PTSD. MiRNAs are an underexplored potential biomarker and target for treatment for psychiatric disease.

== Future research and potential in medicine ==
miRNA-324-5p is a relatively new and understudied microRNA. It is an important regulator in several diseases, and its effects span across the body from neuronal dysregulation in seizure to hepatocellular carcinoma and cardiac disease. Because microRNAs have numerous targets, they are capable of regulating multiple pathways and circuits, an ability that may be useful in the treatment of complex disorders like epilepsy in which many subsystems are dysregulated. However, the wide-ranging functions of miRNAs may be limiting as well. microRNA expression modulation could lead to unanticipated physiological effects and not provide adequate specificity.
