= Il-32 =

IL32 or IL-32 may be:

- Ilyushin Il-32, a Cold War-era Soviet heavy glider
- Interleukin 32, a proinflammatory cytokine
- Illinois Route 32, a state highway in Illinois
