= MicroRNA =

Small non-coding ribonucleic acid molecule

Pre-miRNA instead of Pri-miRNA in the first point of mechanism. Diagram of microRNA (miRNA) action with mRNA

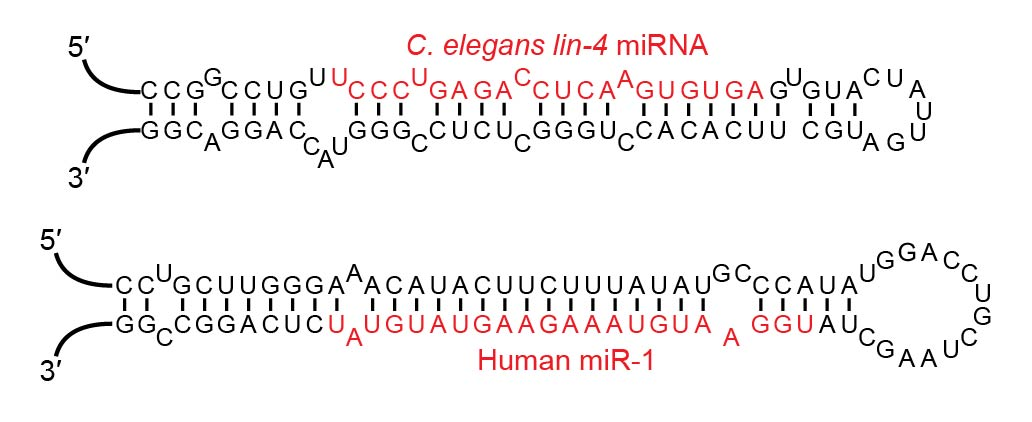
Examples of miRNA hairpins (stem-loops), with the mature miRNAs shown in red

Micro ribonucleic acid (microRNA, miRNA, μRNA) are small, single-stranded, non-coding RNA molecules containing 21–23 nucleotides. Found in plants, animals, and even some viruses, microRNAs are involved in RNA silencing and post-transcriptional regulation of gene expression. miRNAs base-pair to complementary sequences in messenger RNA (mRNA) molecules, then silence these mRNA molecules by one or more of the following processes:

- Cleaving the mRNA strand into two pieces.
- Destabilizing the mRNA by shortening its poly(A) tail.
- Reducing translation of the mRNA into proteins.

In cells of humans and other animals, miRNAs primarily act by destabilizing the mRNA.

miRNAs resemble the small interfering RNAs (siRNAs) of the RNA interference (RNAi) pathway, except miRNAs derive from regions of RNA transcripts that fold back on themselves to form short stem-loops (hairpins), whereas siRNAs derive from longer regions of double-stranded RNA. The human genome may encode over 1900 miRNAs. However, only about 500 human miRNAs represent bona fide miRNAs in the manually curated miRNA gene database MirGeneDB.

miRNAs are abundant in many mammalian cell types. They appear to target about 60% of the genes of humans and other mammals. Many miRNAs are evolutionarily conserved, which implies that they have important biological functions. For example, 90 families of miRNAs have been conserved since at least the common ancestor of mammals and fish, and most of these conserved miRNAs have important functions, as shown by studies in which genes for one or more members of a family have been knocked out in mice.

In 2024, American scientists Victor Ambros and Gary Ruvkun were awarded the Nobel Prize in Physiology or Medicine for their work on the discovery of miRNA and its role in post-transcriptional gene regulation.

== History ==
The first miRNA was discovered in the early 1990s. However, they were not recognized as a distinct class of biological regulators until the early 2000s. Research revealed different sets of miRNAs expressed in different cell types and tissues and multiple roles for miRNAs in plant and animal development and in many other biological processes. Aberrant miRNA expression are implicated in disease states. MiRNA-based therapies are under investigation.

The first miRNA was discovered in 1993 by a group led by Victor Ambros and including Lee and Feinbaum. However, additional insight into its mode of action required simultaneously published work by Gary Ruvkun's team, including Wightman and Ha. These groups published back-to-back papers on the lin-4 gene, which was known to control the timing of C. elegans larval development by repressing the lin-14 gene. When Lee et al. isolated the lin-4 miRNA, they found that instead of producing an mRNA encoding a protein, it produced short non-coding RNAs, one of which was a ~22-nucleotide RNA that contained sequences partially complementary to multiple sequences in the 3' UTR of the lin-14 mRNA. This complementarity was proposed to inhibit the translation of the lin-14 mRNA into the LIN-14 protein. At the time, the lin-4 small RNA was thought to be a nematode idiosyncrasy.

In 2000, a second small RNA was characterized: let-7 RNA, which represses lin-41 to promote a later developmental transition in C. elegans. The let-7 RNA was found to be conserved in many species, leading to the suggestion that let-7 RNA and additional "small temporal RNAs" might regulate the timing of development in diverse animals, including humans.

A year later, the lin-4 and let-7 RNAs were found to be part of a large class of small RNAs present in C. elegans, Drosophila and human cells. The many RNAs of this class resembled the lin-4 and let-7 RNAs, except their expression patterns were usually inconsistent with a role in regulating the timing of development. This suggested that most might function in other types of regulatory pathways. At this point, researchers started using the term "microRNA" to refer to this class of small regulatory RNAs.

The first human disease associated with deregulation of miRNAs was chronic lymphocytic leukemia. In this disorder, the miRNAs have a dual role working as both tumor suppressors and oncogenes.

== Nomenclature ==
Under a standard nomenclature system, names are assigned to experimentally confirmed miRNAs before publication. For animal miRNAs, the prefix "miR" is followed by a dash and a number, the latter often indicating order of naming. For example, miR-124 was named and likely discovered prior to miR-456. A capitalized "miR-" refers to the mature form of the miRNA, while the uncapitalized "mir-" refers to the pre-miRNA and the pri-miRNA. The convention for naming plant miRNAs excludes the hyphen; for example, miR156 or miR172 are well-described plant miRNAs. The genes encoding miRNAs are also named using the same three-letter prefix according to the conventions of the organism gene nomenclature. For examples, the official miRNAs gene names in some organisms are mir-1 in C. elegans and Drosophila, Mir1 in Rattus norvegicus, MIR25 in human, and MIR156 and MIR172 in Arabidopsis.

miRNAs with nearly identical sequences except for one or two nucleotides are annotated with an additional lower case letter. For example, miR-124a is closely related to miR-124b. For example:

hsa-miR-181a: aacauucaACgcugucggugAgu
hsa-miR-181b: aacauucaUUgcugucggugGgu

Pre-miRNAs, pri-miRNAs and genes that lead to 100% identical mature miRNAs but that are located at different places in the genome are indicated with an additional dash-number suffix. For example, the pre-miRNAs hsa-mir-194-1 and hsa-mir-194-2 lead to an identical mature miRNA (hsa-miR-194) but are from genes located in different genome regions.

Species of origin is designated with a three-letter prefix, e.g., hsa-miR-124 is a human (Homo sapiens) miRNA and oar-miR-124 is a sheep (Ovis aries) miRNA. Other common prefixes include "v" for viral (miRNA encoded by a viral genome) and "d" for Drosophila miRNA (a fruit fly commonly studied in genetic research).

When two mature microRNAs originate from opposite arms of the same pre-miRNA and are found in roughly similar amounts, they are denoted with a -3p or -5p suffix. (In the past, this distinction was also made with "s" (sense) and "as" (antisense)). However, the mature microRNA found from one arm of the hairpin is usually much more abundant than that found from the other arm, in which case, an asterisk following the name indicates the mature species found at low levels from the opposite arm of a hairpin. For example, miR-124 and miR-124* share a pre-miRNA hairpin, but much more miR-124 is found in the cell.

== Targets ==
Plant miRNAs usually have near-perfect pairing with their mRNA targets, which induces gene repression through cleavage of the target transcripts. In contrast, animal miRNAs are able to recognize their target mRNAs by using as few as 6–8 nucleotides (the seed region) at the 5' end of the miRNA, which is not enough pairing to induce cleavage of the target mRNAs. Combinatorial regulation is a feature of miRNA regulation in animals. A given miRNA may have hundreds of different mRNA targets, and a given target might be regulated by multiple miRNAs.

Estimates of the average number of unique messenger RNAs that are targets for repression by a typical miRNA vary, depending on the estimation method, but multiple approaches show that mammalian miRNAs can have many unique targets. For example, an analysis of the miRNAs highly conserved in vertebrates shows that each has, on average, roughly 400 conserved targets. Likewise, experiments show that a single miRNA species can reduce the stability of hundreds of unique messenger RNAs. Other experiments show that a single miRNA species may repress the production of hundreds of proteins, but that this repression often is relatively mild (much less than 2-fold).

== Biogenesis ==
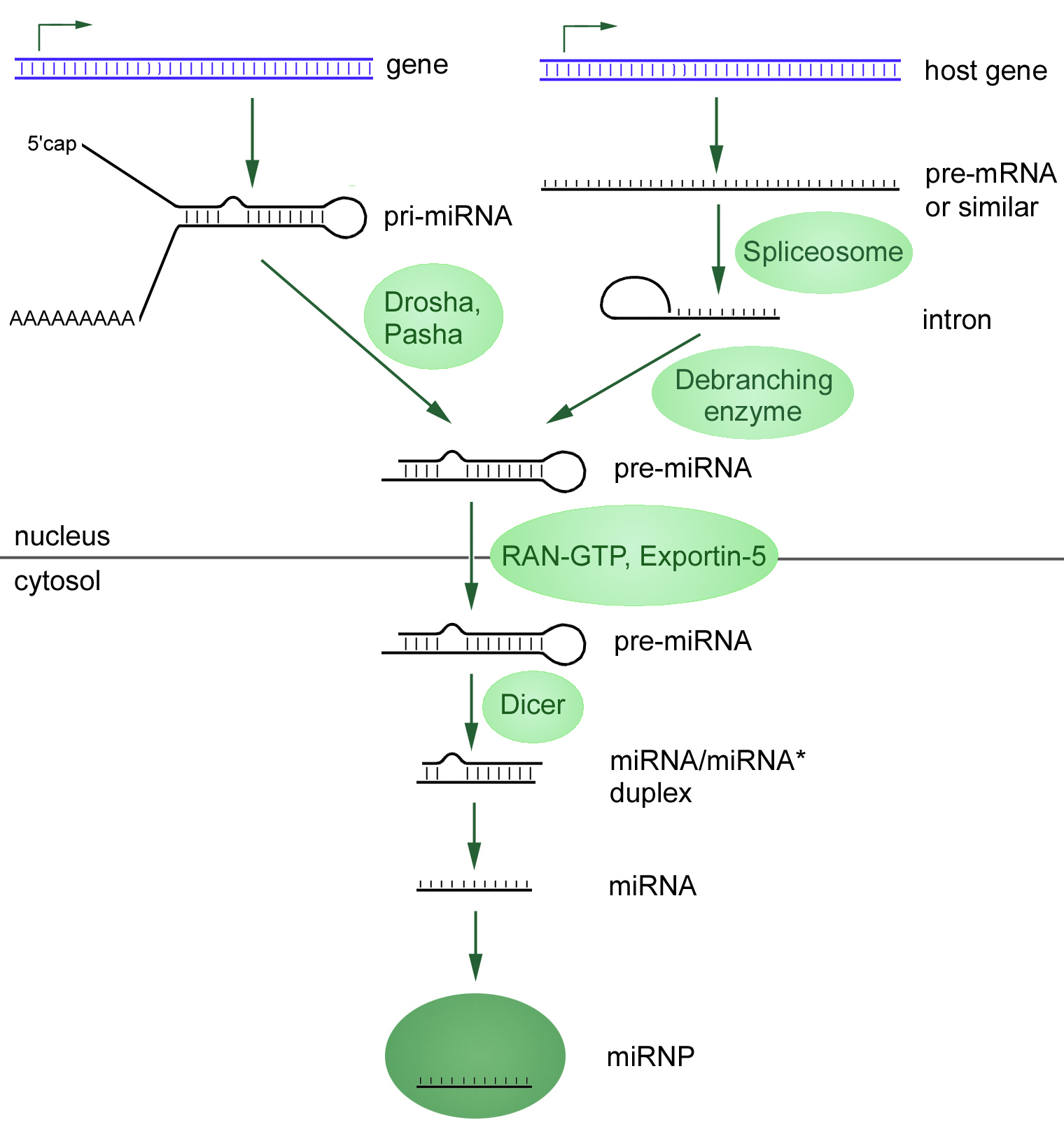

As many as 40% of miRNA genes may lie in the introns or even exons of other genes. These are usually, though not exclusively, found in a sense orientation, and thus usually are regulated together with their host genes.

The DNA template is not the final word on mature miRNA production: 6% of human miRNAs show RNA editing (isomiRs), the site-specific modification of RNA sequences to yield products different from those encoded by their DNA. This increases the diversity and scope of miRNA action beyond that implicated from the genome alone.

=== Transcription ===
miRNA genes are usually transcribed by RNA polymerase II (Pol II). The polymerase often binds to a promoter found near the DNA sequence, encoding what will become the hairpin loop of the pre-miRNA. The resulting transcript is capped with a specially modified nucleotide at the 5' end, polyadenylated with multiple adenosines (a poly(A) tail), and spliced. Animal miRNAs are initially transcribed as part of one arm of an ~80 nucleotide RNA hairpin that in turn forms part of a several hundred nucleotide-long miRNA precursor termed a pri-miRNA. When a hairpin precursor is found in the 3' UTR, a transcript may serve as a pri-miRNA and a mRNA. RNA polymerase III (Pol III) transcribes some miRNAs, especially those with upstream Alu sequences, transfer RNAs (tRNAs), and mammalian wide interspersed repeat (MWIR) promoter units.

=== Nuclear processing ===
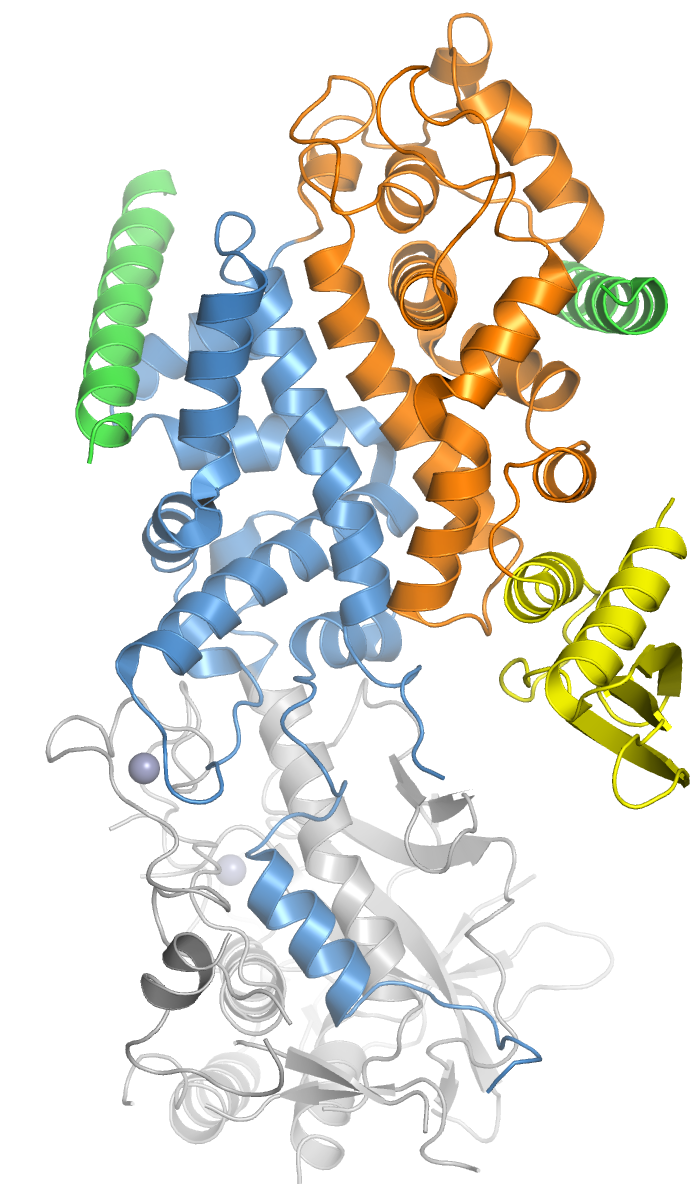
A crystal structure of the human Drosha protein in complex with the C-terminal helices of two DGCR8 molecules (green). Drosha consists of two ribonuclease III domains (blue and orange); a double-stranded RNA binding domain (yellow); and a connector/platform domain (gray) containing two bound zinc ion (spheres). From PDB: 5B16.

A single pri-miRNA may contain from one to six miRNA precursors. These hairpin loop structures are composed of about 70 nucleotides each. Each hairpin is flanked by sequences necessary for efficient processing.

The double-stranded RNA (dsRNA) structure of the hairpins in a pri-miRNA is recognized by a nuclear protein known as DiGeorge Syndrome Critical Region 8 (DGCR8 or "Pasha" in invertebrates), named for its association with DiGeorge Syndrome. DGCR8 associates with the enzyme Drosha, a protein that cuts RNA, to form the microprocessor complex. In this complex, DGCR8 orients the catalytic RNase III domain of Drosha to liberate hairpins from pri-miRNAs by cleaving RNA about eleven nucleotides from the hairpin base (one helical dsRNA turn into the stem). The product resulting has a two-nucleotide overhang at its 3' end; it has 3' hydroxyl and 5' phosphate groups. It is often termed as a pre-miRNA (precursor-miRNA). Sequence motifs downstream of the pre-miRNA that are important for efficient processing have been identified.

Pre-miRNAs that are spliced directly out of introns, bypassing the microprocessor complex, are known as "mirtrons." Mirtrons have been found in Drosophila, C. elegans, and mammals.

As many as 16% of pre-miRNAs may be altered through nuclear RNA editing. Most commonly, enzymes known as adenosine deaminases acting on RNA (ADARs) catalyze adenosine to inosine (A to I) transitions. RNA editing can halt nuclear processing (for example, of pri-miR-142, leading to degradation by the ribonuclease Tudor-SN) and alter downstream processes including cytoplasmic miRNA processing and target specificity (e.g., by changing the seed region of miR-376 in the central nervous system).

=== Nuclear export ===
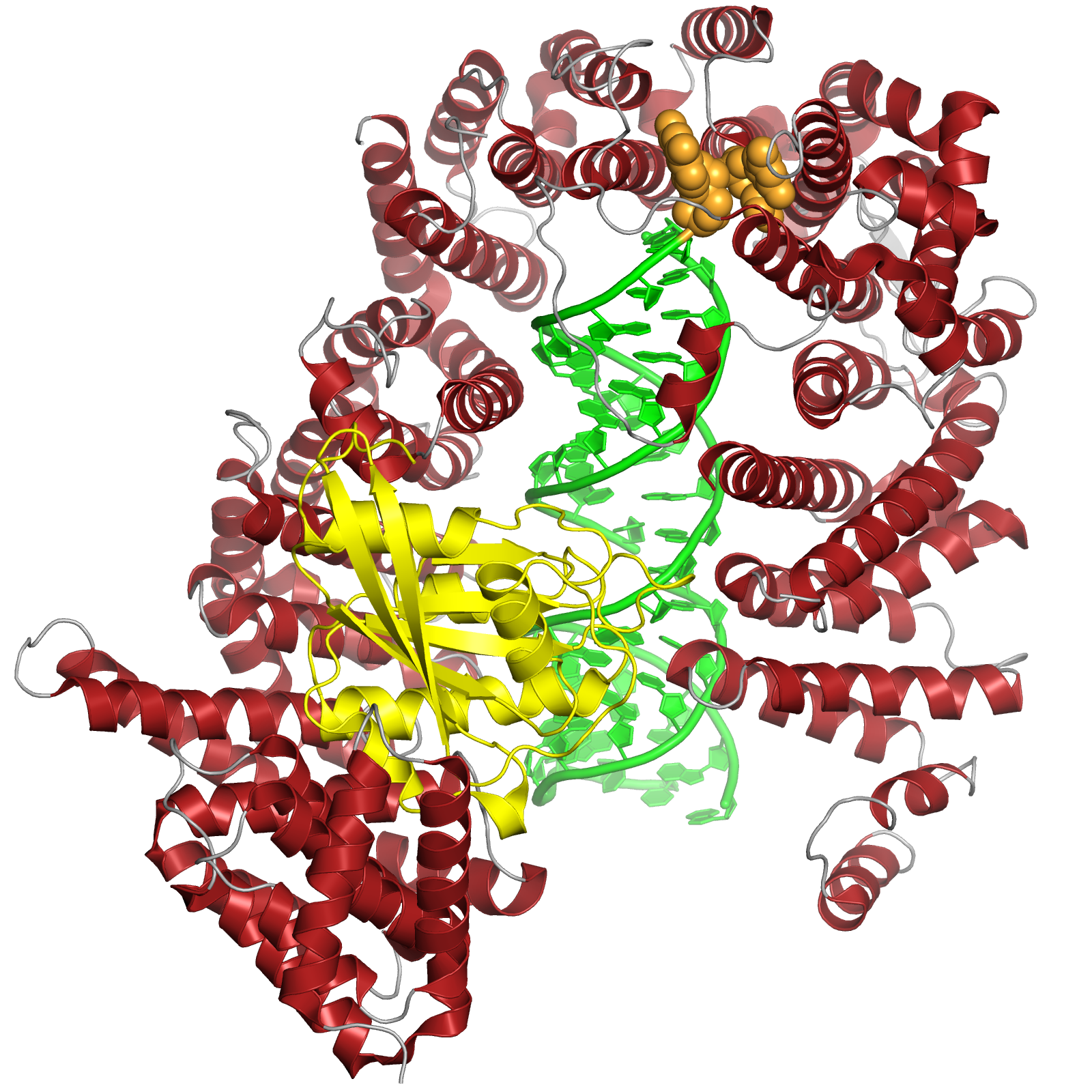
The human exportin-5 protein (red) in complex with Ran-GTP (yellow) and a pre-microRNA (green), showing two-nucleotide overhang recognition element (orange). From PDB: 3A6P.

Pre-miRNA hairpins are exported from the nucleus in a process involving the nucleocytoplasmic shuttler Exportin-5. This protein, a member of the karyopherin family, recognizes a two-nucleotide overhang left by the RNase III enzyme Drosha at the 3' end of the pre-miRNA hairpin. Exportin-5-mediated transport to the cytoplasm is energy-dependent, using guanosine triphosphate (GTP) bound to the Ran protein.

=== Cytoplasmic processing ===
In the cytoplasm, the pre-miRNA hairpin is cleaved by the RNase III enzyme Dicer. This endoribonuclease interacts with 5' and 3' ends of the hairpin and cuts away the loop joining the 3' and 5' arms, yielding an imperfect miRNA:miRNA* duplex about 22 nucleotides in length. Overall hairpin length and loop size influence the efficiency of Dicer processing. The imperfect nature of the miRNA:miRNA* pairing also affects cleavage. Some of the G-rich pre-miRNAs can potentially adopt the G-quadruplex structure as an alternative to the canonical hairpin structure. For example, human pre-miRNA 92b adopts a G-quadruplex structure which is resistant to the Dicer mediated cleavage in the cytoplasm. Although either strand of the duplex may potentially act as a functional miRNA, only one strand is usually incorporated into the RNA-induced silencing complex (RISC) where the miRNA and its mRNA target interact.

While the majority of miRNAs are located within the cell, some miRNAs, commonly known as circulating miRNAs or extracellular miRNAs, have also been found in extracellular environment, including various biological fluids and cell culture media.

=== Biogenesis in plants ===
miRNA biogenesis in plants differs from animal biogenesis mainly in the steps of nuclear processing and export. Instead of being cleaved by two different enzymes, once inside and once outside the nucleus, both cleavages of the plant miRNA are performed by a Dicer homolog, called Dicer-like1 (DL1). DL1 is expressed only in the nucleus of plant cells, which indicates that both reactions take place inside the nucleus. Before plant miRNA:miRNA* duplexes are transported out of the nucleus, its 3' overhangs are methylated by a RNA methyltransferaseprotein called Hua-Enhancer1 (HEN1). The duplex is then transported out of the nucleus to the cytoplasm by a protein called Hasty (HST), an Exportin 5 homolog, where they disassemble and the mature miRNA is incorporated into the RISC.

== RNA-induced silencing complex ==
The mature miRNA is part of an active RNA-induced silencing complex (RISC) containing Dicer and many associated proteins. RISC is also known as a microRNA ribonucleoprotein complex (miRNP); A RISC with incorporated miRNA is sometimes referred to as a "miRISC."

Dicer processing of the pre-miRNA is thought to be coupled with unwinding of the duplex. Generally, only one strand is incorporated into the miRISC, selected on the basis of its thermodynamic instability and weaker base-pairing on the 5' end relative to the other strand. The position of the hairpin may also influence strand choice. The other strand, called the passenger strand due to its lower levels in the steady state, is denoted with an asterisk (*) and is normally degraded. In some cases, both strands of the duplex are viable and become functional miRNA that target different mRNA populations.

AGO2 (grey) in complex with a microRNA (light blue) and its target mRNA (dark blue)

Members of the Argonaute (Ago) protein family are central to RISC function. Argonautes are needed for miRNA-induced silencing and contain two conserved RNA binding domains: a PAZ domain that can bind the single stranded 3' end of the mature miRNA and a PIWI domain that structurally resembles ribonuclease-H and functions to interact with the 5' end of the guide strand. They bind the mature miRNA and orient it for interaction with a target mRNA. Some argonautes, for example human Ago2, cleave target transcripts directly; argonautes may also recruit additional proteins to achieve translational repression. The human genome encodes eight argonaute proteins divided by sequence similarities into two families: AGO (with four members present in all mammalian cells and called E1F2C/hAgo in humans), and PIWI (found in the germline and hematopoietic stem cells).

Additional RISC components include TRBP [human immunodeficiency virus (HIV) transactivating response RNA (TAR) binding protein], PACT (protein activator of the interferon-induced protein kinase), the SMN complex, fragile X mental retardation protein (FMRP), Tudor staphylococcal nuclease-domain-containing protein (Tudor-SN), the putative DNA helicase MOV10, and the RNA recognition motif containing protein TNRC6B.

=== Mode of silencing and regulatory loops ===
Gene silencing may occur either via mRNA degradation or preventing mRNA from being translated. For example, miR16 contains a sequence complementary to the AU-rich element found in the 3'UTR of many unstable mRNAs, such as TNF alpha or GM-CSF. It has been demonstrated that given complete complementarity between the miRNA and target mRNA sequence, Ago2 can cleave the mRNA and lead to direct mRNA degradation. In the absence of complementarity, silencing is achieved by preventing translation. The relation of miRNA and its target mRNA can be based on the simple negative regulation of a target mRNA, but it seems that a common scenario is the use of a "coherent feed-forward loop", "mutual negative feedback loop" (also termed double negative loop) and "positive feedback/feed-forward loop". Some miRNAs work as buffers of random gene expression changes arising due to stochastic events in transcription, translation and protein stability. Such regulation is typically achieved by the virtue of negative feedback loops or incoherent feed-forward loop uncoupling protein output from mRNA transcription.

== Turnover ==
Turnover of mature miRNA is needed for rapid changes in miRNA expression profiles. During miRNA maturation in the cytoplasm, uptake by the Argonaute protein is thought to stabilize the guide strand, while the opposite (* or "passenger") strand is preferentially destroyed. In what has been called a "Use it or lose it" strategy, Argonaute may preferentially retain miRNAs with many targets over miRNAs with few or no targets, leading to degradation of the non-targeting molecules.

Decay of mature miRNAs in Caenorhabditis elegans is mediated by the 5'-to-3' exoribonuclease XRN2, also known as Rat1p. In plants, SDN (small RNA degrading nuclease) family members degrade miRNAs in the opposite (3'-to-5') direction. Similar enzymes are encoded in animal genomes, but their roles have not been described.

Several miRNA modifications affect miRNA stability. As indicated by work in the model organism Arabidopsis thaliana (thale cress), mature plant miRNAs appear to be stabilized by the addition of methyl moieties at the 3' end. The 2'-O-conjugated methyl groups block the addition of uracil (U) residues by uridyltransferase enzymes, a modification that may be associated with miRNA degradation. However, uridylation may also protect some miRNAs; the consequences of this modification are incompletely understood. Uridylation of some animal miRNAs has been reported. Both plant and animal miRNAs may be altered by addition of adenine (A) residues to the 3' end of the miRNA. An extra A added to the end of mammalian miR-122, a liver-enriched miRNA important in hepatitis C, stabilizes the molecule and plant miRNAs ending with an adenine residue have slower decay rates.

== Cellular functions ==
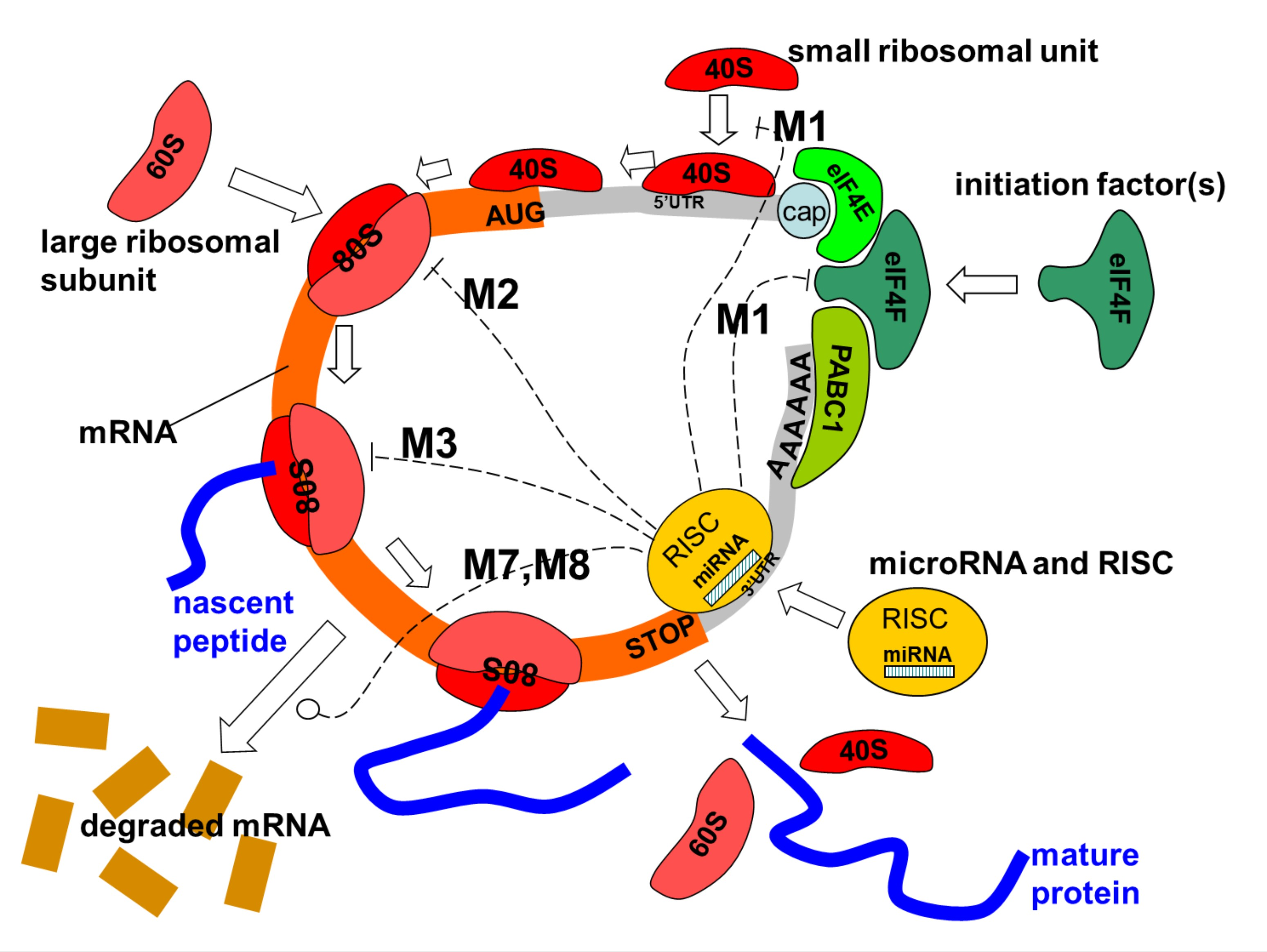
Interaction of microRNA with protein translation process. Several translation repression mechanisms are shown: M1) on the initiation process, preventing assembling of the initiation complex or recruiting the 40S ribosomal subunit; M2) on the ribosome assembly; M3) on the translation process; M7, M8) on the degradation of mRNA. 40S and 60S are light and heavy components of the ribosome, 80S is the assembled ribosome bound to mRNA, eIF4F is a translation initiation factor, PABC1 is the Poly-A binding protein, and "cap" is the mRNA cap structure needed for mRNA circularization (which can be the normal m7G-cap or modified A-cap). The initiation of mRNA can proceed in a cap-independent manner, through recruiting 40S to IRES (Internal Ribosome Entry Site) located in 5'UTR region. The actual work of RNA silencing is performed by RISC in which the main catalytic subunit is one of the Argonaute proteins (AGO), and miRNA serves as a template for recognizing specific mRNA sequences.

The function of miRNAs appears to be in gene regulation. For that purpose, a miRNA is complementary to a part of one or more messenger RNAs (mRNAs). Animal miRNAs are usually complementary to a site in the 3' UTR whereas plant miRNAs are usually complementary to coding regions of mRNAs. Perfect or near perfect base pairing with the target RNA promotes cleavage of the RNA. This is the primary mode of plant miRNAs. In animals the match-ups are imperfect.

For partially complementary microRNAs to recognise their targets, nucleotides 2–7 of the miRNA (its 'seed region') must be perfectly complementary. Animal miRNAs inhibit protein translation of the target mRNA (this is present but less common in plants). Partially complementary microRNAs can also speed up deadenylation, causing mRNAs to be degraded sooner. While degradation of miRNA-targeted mRNA is well documented, whether or not translational repression is accomplished through mRNA degradation, translational inhibition, or a combination of the two is hotly debated. Recent work on miR-430 in zebrafish, as well as on bantam-miRNA and miR-9 in Drosophila cultured cells, shows that translational repression is caused by the disruption of translation initiation, independent of mRNA deadenylation.

miRNAs occasionally also cause histone modification and DNA methylation of promoter sites, which affects the expression of target genes.

Nine mechanisms of miRNA action are described and assembled in a unified mathematical model:

- Cap-40S initiation inhibition;
- 60S Ribosomal unit joining inhibition;
- Elongation inhibition;
- Ribosome drop-off (premature termination);
- Co-translational nascent protein degradation;
- Sequestration in P-bodies;
- mRNA decay (destabilisation);
- mRNA cleavage;
- Transcriptional inhibition through microRNA-mediated chromatin reorganization followed by gene silencing.

It is often impossible to discern these mechanisms using experimental data about stationary reaction rates. Nevertheless, they are differentiated in dynamics and have different kinetic signatures.

Unlike plant microRNAs, the animal microRNAs target diverse genes. However, genes involved in functions common to all cells, such as gene expression, have relatively fewer microRNA target sites and seem to be under selection to avoid targeting by microRNAs. There is a strong correlation between ITPR gene regulations and mir-92 and mir-19.

dsRNA can also activate gene expression, a mechanism that has been termed "small RNA-induced gene activation" or RNAa. dsRNAs targeting gene promoters can induce potent transcriptional activation of associated genes. This was demonstrated in human cells using synthetic dsRNAs termed small activating RNAs (saRNAs), but has also been demonstrated for endogenous microRNA.

Interactions between microRNAs and complementary sequences on genes and even pseudogenes that share sequence homology are thought to be a back channel of communication regulating expression levels between paralogous genes (genes having a similar structure indicating divergence from a common ancestral gene). Given the name "competing endogenous RNAs" (ceRNAs), these microRNAs bind to "microRNA response elements" on genes and pseudogenes and may provide another explanation for the persistence of non-coding DNA.

miRNAs are also found as extracellular circulating miRNAs. Circulating miRNAs are released into body fluids including blood and cerebrospinal fluid and have the potential to be available as biomarkers in a number of diseases. Some researches show that mRNA cargo of exosomes may have a role in implantation, they can savage an adhesion between trophoblast and endometrium or support the adhesion by down regulating or up regulating expression of genes involved in adhesion/invasion.

Moreover, miRNA as miR-183/96/182 seems to play a key role in circadian rhythm.

== Evolution ==
=== Origin of miRNA ===
miRNAs are well conserved in both plants and animals, and are thought to be a vital and evolutionarily ancient component of gene regulation. While core components of the microRNA pathway are conserved between plants and animals, miRNA repertoires in the two kingdoms appear to have emerged independently with different primary modes of action.

microRNAs feature in the genomes of most eukaryotic organisms, from the brown algae to the animals. However, the difference in how these microRNAs function and the way they are processed suggests that microRNAs arose independently in plants and animals.

=== Phylogenetics ===
microRNAs are useful phylogenetic markers because of their apparently low rate of evolution. microRNAs' origin as a regulatory mechanism developed from previous RNAi machinery that was initially used as a defense against exogenous genetic material such as viruses. Their origin may have permitted the development of morphological innovation, and by making gene expression more specific and 'fine-tunable', permitted the genesis of complex organs and perhaps, ultimately, complex life. Rapid bursts of morphological innovation are generally associated with a high rate of microRNA accumulation.

=== Novel miRNA formation ===
New microRNAs are created in multiple ways. Novel microRNAs can originate from the random formation of hairpins in "non-coding" sections of DNA (i.e. introns or intergene regions), but also by the duplication and modification of existing microRNAs. microRNAs can also form from inverted duplications of protein-coding sequences, which allows for the creation of a foldback hairpin structure. The rate of evolution (i.e. nucleotide substitution) in recently originated microRNAs is comparable to that elsewhere in the non-coding DNA, implying evolution by neutral drift; however, older microRNAs have a much lower rate of change (often less than one substitution per hundred million years), suggesting that once a microRNA gains a function, it undergoes purifying selection. Individual regions within an miRNA gene face different evolutionary pressures, where regions that are vital for processing and function have higher levels of conservation. At this point, a microRNA is rarely lost from an animal's genome, although newer microRNAs (thus presumably non-functional) are frequently lost. In Arabidopsis thaliana, the net flux of miRNA genes has been predicted to be between 1.2 and 3.3 genes per million years. This makes them a valuable phylogenetic marker, and they are being looked upon as a possible solution to outstanding phylogenetic problems such as the relationships of arthropods. On the other hand, in multiple cases microRNAs correlate poorly with phylogeny, and it is possible that their phylogenetic concordance largely reflects a limited sampling of microRNAs.

Focusing on the animals, the genome of Mnemiopsis leidyi appears to lack recognizable microRNAs, as well as the nuclear proteins Drosha and Pasha, which are critical to canonical microRNA biogenesis. It is the only animal thus far reported to be missing Drosha. MicroRNAs play a vital role in the regulation of gene expression in all non-ctenophore animals investigated thus far except for Trichoplax adhaerens, the first known member of the phylum Placozoa.

Across all species, in excess of 5000 different miRNAs had been identified by March 2010. Whilst short RNA sequences (50 – hundreds of base pairs) of a broadly comparable function occur in bacteria, bacteria lack true microRNAs.

=== Role in speciation ===
MicroRNA plays an important role in speciation and adaptive radiation. In rapidly diversifying lineages such as cichlids, microRNA binding sites are under strong diversifying selection, enabling rapid generation of novel phenotypes by changing the expression of preexisting genes.

== Experimental detection and manipulation ==
While researchers focused on miRNA expression in physiological and pathological processes, various technical variables related to microRNA isolation emerged. The stability of stored miRNA samples has been questioned. microRNAs degrade much more easily than mRNAs, partly due to their length, but also because of ubiquitously present RNases. This makes it necessary to cool samples on ice and use RNase-free equipment.

microRNA expression can be quantified in a two-step polymerase chain reaction process of modified RT-PCR followed by quantitative PCR. Variations of this method achieve absolute or relative quantification. miRNAs can also be hybridized to microarrays, slides or chips with probes to hundreds or thousands of miRNA targets, so that relative levels of miRNAs can be determined in different samples. microRNAs can be both discovered and profiled by high-throughput sequencing methods (microRNA sequencing). The activity of an miRNA can be experimentally inhibited using a locked nucleic acid (LNA) oligo, a Morpholino oligo or a 2'-O-methyl RNA oligo. A specific miRNA can be silenced by a complementary antagomir. microRNA maturation can be inhibited at several points by steric-blocking oligos. The miRNA target site of an mRNA transcript can also be blocked by a steric-blocking oligo. For the "in situ" detection of miRNA, LNA or Morpholino probes can be used. The locked conformation of LNA results in enhanced hybridization properties and increases sensitivity and selectivity, making it ideal for detection of short miRNA.

High-throughput quantification of miRNAs is error prone, for the larger variance (compared to mRNAs) that comes with methodological problems. mRNA-expression is therefore often analyzed to check for miRNA-effects in their levels (e.g. in). Databases can be used to pair mRNA- and miRNA-data that predict miRNA-targets based on their base sequence. While this is usually done after miRNAs of interest have been detected (e. g. because of high expression levels), ideas for analysis tools that integrate mRNA- and miRNA-expression information have been proposed.

== Human and animal diseases ==
Just as miRNA is involved in the normal functioning of eukaryotic cells, so has dysregulation of miRNA been associated with disease. A manually curated, publicly available database, miR2Disease, documents known relationships between miRNA dysregulation and human disease.

=== Inherited diseases ===
A mutation in the seed region of miR-96 causes hereditary progressive hearing loss.

A mutation in the seed region of miR-184 causes hereditary keratoconus with anterior polar cataract.

Deletion of the miR-17~92 cluster causes skeletal and growth defects.

=== Cancer ===
Role of miRNA in a cancer cell

The first human disease known to be associated with miRNA deregulation was chronic lymphocytic leukemia. Many other miRNAs also have links with cancer and accordingly are sometimes referred to as "oncomirs". In malignant B cells miRNAs participate in pathways fundamental to B cell development like B-cell receptor (BCR) signalling, B-cell migration/adhesion, cell-cell interactions in immune niches and the production and class-switching of immunoglobulins. MiRNAs influence B cell maturation, generation of pre-, marginal zone, follicular, B1, plasma and memory B cells.

Another role for miRNA in cancers is to use their expression level for prognosis. In NSCLC samples, low miR-324a levels may serve as an indicator of poor survival. Either high miR-185 or low miR-133b levels may correlate with metastasis and poor survival in colorectal cancer.

Furthermore, specific miRNAs may be associated with certain histological subtypes of colorectal cancer. For instance, expression levels of miR-205 and miR-373 have been shown to be increased in mucinous colorectal cancers and mucin-producing Ulcerative Colitis-associated colon cancers, but not in sporadic colonic adenocarcinoma that lack mucinous components. In-vitro studies suggested that miR-205 and miR-373 may functionally induce different features of mucinous-associated neoplastic progression in intestinal epithelial cells.

Hepatocellular carcinoma cell proliferation may arise from miR-21 interaction with MAP2K3, a tumor repressor gene. Optimal treatment for cancer involves accurately identifying patients for risk-stratified therapy. Those with a rapid response to initial treatment may benefit from truncated treatment regimens, showing the value of accurate disease response measures. Cell-free circulating miRNAs (cimiRNAs) are highly stable in blood, are overexpressed in cancer and are quantifiable within the diagnostic laboratory. In classical Hodgkin lymphoma, plasma miR-21, miR-494, and miR-1973 are promising disease response biomarkers. Circulating miRNAs have the potential to assist clinical decision making and aid interpretation of positron emission tomography combined with computerized tomography. They can be performed at each consultation to assess disease response and detect relapse.

In contrast, microRNAs have the potential to be used as tools or targets for treatment of different cancers. tumor suppressive miRNA like the let-7-5p miRNA family are commonly suppressed in cancers like hepatocellular carcinoma, where their loss permits aberrant expression of oncogenic targets that drive tumor progression and chemoresistance (including the RNA-binding protein LIN28B and the multidrug resistance transporter ABCC5/MRP5). Restoring let-7-5p expression is therefore a candidate therapeutic strategy in cancer.

Members of the same let-7-5p family share nearly identical sequences yet differ by one or more nucleotides outside the conserved seed region, and these subtle differences can translate into meaningful variation in target selectivity and regulatory potency. The seven major human let-7 isoforms (let-7a through let-7i) are not functionally interchangeable, with small sequence differences outside the seed region conferring distinct functional differences in target repression and anticancer efficacy that must be considered when selecting candidates for miRNA replacement therapy.

Another microRNA, miR-506, has also been found to work as a tumor antagonist in several studies. A significant number of cervical cancer samples were found to have downregulated expression of miR-506. Additionally, miR-506 works to promote apoptosis of cervical cancer cells, through its direct target hedgehog pathway transcription factor, Gli3.

Investigating miRNA biology and developing replacement therapies requires research tools that accurately reflect the properties of endogenous miRNA. Chemically synthesized miRNA mimics, which are widely used in research, differ from naturally processed miRNA in their chemical structure and lack the post- transcriptional modifications acquired during biogenesis in living cells; these differences can affect how faithfully they recapitulate endogenous miRNA function and limit their suitability for studying native regulatory mechanisms or translating findings to therapeutic contexts.

To address this limitation, RNA bioengineering platforms have been developed that produce recombinant miRNA molecules by expression in living cells, yielding agents whose structures and chemical modifications more closely resemble those of endogenous miRNA. Such bioengineered RNA agents have been applied to interrogate post-transcriptional gene regulation mechanisms dysregulated in cancer and investigate miRNA replacement therapy in preclinical cancer models, where they have demonstrated antitumor activity and pharmacological synergism with co-administered drugs through restoration of natural miRNA function.

=== DNA repair and cancer ===
Many miRNAs can directly target and inhibit cell cycle genes to control cell proliferation. A new strategy for tumor treatment is to inhibit tumor cell proliferation by repairing the defective miRNA pathway in tumors. Cancer is caused by the accumulation of mutations from either DNA damage or uncorrected errors in DNA replication. Defects in DNA repair cause the accumulation of mutations, which can lead to cancer. Several genes involved in DNA repair are regulated by microRNAs.

Germline mutations in DNA repair genes cause only 2–5% of colon cancer cases. However, altered expression of microRNAs, causing DNA repair deficiencies, are frequently associated with cancers and may be an important causal factor. Among 68 sporadic colon cancers with reduced expression of the DNA mismatch repair protein MLH1, most were found to be deficient due to epigenetic methylation of the CpG island of the MLH1 gene. However, up to 15% of MLH1-deficiencies in sporadic colon cancers appeared to be due to over-expression of the microRNA miR-155, which represses MLH1 expression.

In 29–66% of glioblastomas, DNA repair is deficient due to epigenetic methylation of the MGMT gene, which reduces protein expression of MGMT. However, for 28% of glioblastomas, the MGMT protein is deficient, but the MGMT promoter is not methylated. In glioblastomas without methylated MGMT promoters, the level of microRNA miR-181d is inversely correlated with protein expression of MGMT and the direct target of miR-181d is the MGMT mRNA 3'UTR (the three prime untranslated region of MGMT mRNA). Thus, in 28% of glioblastomas, increased expression of miR-181d and reduced expression of DNA repair enzyme MGMT may be a causal factor.

HMGA proteins (HMGA1a, HMGA1b and HMGA2) are implicated in cancer, and expression of these proteins is regulated by microRNAs. HMGA expression is almost undetectable in differentiated adult tissues, but is elevated in many cancers. HMGA proteins are polypeptides of ~100 amino acid residues characterized by a modular sequence organization. These proteins have three highly positively charged regions, termed AT hooks, that bind the minor groove of AT-rich DNA stretches in specific regions of DNA. Human neoplasias, including thyroid, prostatic, cervical, colorectal, pancreatic and ovarian carcinomas, show a strong increase of HMGA1a and HMGA1b proteins. Transgenic mice with HMGA1 targeted to lymphoid cells develop aggressive lymphoma, showing that high HMGA1 expression is associated with cancers and that HMGA1 can act as an oncogene. HMGA2 protein specifically targets the promoter of ERCC1, thus reducing expression of this DNA repair gene. ERCC1 protein expression was deficient in 100% of 47 evaluated colon cancers (though the extent to which HGMA2 was involved is not known).

Single Nucleotide polymorphisms (SNPs) can alter the binding of miRNAs on 3'UTRs for example the case of hsa-mir181a and hsa-mir181b on the CDON tumor suppressor gene.

=== Heart disease ===
The global role of miRNA function in the heart has been addressed by conditionally inhibiting miRNA maturation in the murine heart. This revealed that miRNAs play an essential role during its development. miRNA expression profiling studies demonstrate that expression levels of specific miRNAs change in diseased human hearts, pointing to their involvement in cardiomyopathies. Furthermore, animal studies on specific miRNAs identified distinct roles for miRNAs both during heart development and under pathological conditions, including the regulation of key factors important for cardiogenesis, the hypertrophic growth response and cardiac conductance. Another role for miRNA in cardiovascular diseases is to use their expression levels for diagnosis, prognosis or risk stratification. miRNA's in animal models have also been linked to cholesterol metabolism and regulation.

==== miRNA-712 ====
Murine microRNA-712 is a potential biomarker (i.e. predictor) for atherosclerosis, a cardiovascular disease of the arterial wall associated with lipid retention and inflammation. Non-laminar blood flow also correlates with development of atherosclerosis as mechanosenors of endothelial cells respond to the shear force of disturbed flow (d-flow). A number of pro-atherogenic genes including matrix metalloproteinases (MMPs) are upregulated by d-flow, mediating pro-inflammatory and pro-angiogenic signals. These findings were observed in ligated carotid arteries of mice to mimic the effects of d-flow. Within 24 hours, pre-existing immature miR-712 formed mature miR-712 suggesting that miR-712 is flow-sensitive. Coinciding with these results, miR-712 is also upregulated in endothelial cells exposed to naturally occurring d-flow in the greater curvature of the aortic arch.

==== Origin ====
Pre-mRNA sequence of miR-712 is generated from the murine ribosomal RN45s gene at the internal transcribed spacer region 2 (ITS2). XRN1 is an exonuclease that degrades the ITS2 region during processing of RN45s. Reduction of XRN1 under d-flow conditions therefore leads to the accumulation of miR-712.

==== Mechanism ====
MiR-712 targets tissue inhibitor of metalloproteinases 3 (TIMP3). TIMPs normally regulate activity of matrix metalloproteinases (MMPs) which degrade the extracellular matrix (ECM). Arterial ECM is mainly composed of collagen and elastin fibers, providing the structural support and recoil properties of arteries. These fibers play a critical role in regulation of vascular inflammation and permeability, which are important in the development of atherosclerosis. Expressed by endothelial cells, TIMP3 is the only ECM-bound TIMP. A decrease in TIMP3 expression results in an increase of ECM degradation in the presence of d-flow. Consistent with these findings, inhibition of pre-miR712 increases expression of TIMP3 in cells, even when exposed to turbulent flow.

TIMP3 also decreases the expression of TNFα (a pro-inflammatory regulator) during turbulent flow. Activity of TNFα in turbulent flow was measured by the expression of TNFα-converting enzyme (TACE) in blood. TNFα decreased if miR-712 was inhibited or TIMP3 overexpressed, suggesting that miR-712 and TIMP3 regulate TACE activity in turbulent flow conditions.

Anti-miR-712 effectively suppresses d-flow-induced miR-712 expression and increases TIMP3 expression. Anti-miR-712 also inhibits vascular hyperpermeability, thereby significantly reducing atherosclerosis lesion development and immune cell infiltration.

==== Human homolog microRNA-205 ====
The human homolog of miR-712 was found on the RN45s homolog gene, which maintains similar miRNAs to mice. MiR-205 of humans share similar sequences with miR-712 of mice and is conserved across most vertebrates. MiR-205 and miR-712 also share more than 50% of the cell signaling targets, including TIMP3.

When tested, d-flow decreased the expression of XRN1 in humans as it did in mice endothelial cells, indicating a potentially common role of XRN1 in humans.

=== Kidney disease ===
Targeted deletion of Dicer in the FoxD1-derived renal progenitor cells in a murine model resulted in a complex renal phenotype including expansion of nephron progenitors, fewer renin cells, smooth muscle arterioles, progressive mesangial loss and glomerular aneurysms. High throughput whole transcriptome profiling of the FoxD1-Dicer knockout mouse model revealed ectopic upregulation of pro-apoptotic gene, Bcl2L11 (Bim) and dysregulation of the p53 pathway with increase in p53 effector genes including Bax, Trp53inp1, Jun, Cdkn1a, Mmp2, and Arid3a. p53 protein levels remained unchanged, suggesting that FoxD1 stromal miRNAs directly repress p53-effector genes. Using a lineage tracing approach followed by Fluorescent-activated cell sorting, miRNA profiling of the FoxD1-derived cells not only comprehensively defined the transcriptional landscape of miRNAs that are critical for vascular development, but also identified key miRNAs that are likely to modulate the renal phenotype in its absence. These miRNAs include miRs-10a, 18a, 19b, 24, 30c, 92a, 106a, 130a, 152, 181a, 214, 222, 302a, 370, and 381 that regulate Bcl2L11 (Bim) and miRs-15b, 18a, 21, 30c, 92a, 106a, 125b-5p, 145, 214, 222, 296-5p and 302a that regulate p53-effector genes. Consistent with the profiling results, ectopic apoptosis was observed in the cellular derivatives of the FoxD1 derived progenitor lineage and reiterates the importance of renal stromal miRNAs in cellular homeostasis.

=== Nervous system ===
MiRNAs are crucial for the healthy development and function of the nervous system. Previous studies demonstrate that miRNAs can regulate neuronal differentiation and maturation at various stages. MiRNAs also play important roles in synaptic development (such as dendritogenesis or spine morphogenesis) and synaptic plasticity (contributing to learning and memory). Elimination of miRNA formation in mice by experimental silencing of Dicer has led to pathological outcomes, such as reduced neuronal size, motor abnormalities (when silenced in striatal neurons), and neurodegeneration (when silenced in forebrain neurons). Altered miRNA expression has been found in neurodegenerative diseases (such as Alzheimer's disease, Parkinson's disease, and Huntington's disease) as well as many psychiatric disorders (including epilepsy, schizophrenia, major depression, bipolar disorder, and anxiety disorders).

==== Stroke ====
According to the Center for Disease Control and Prevention, Stroke is one of the leading causes of death and long-term disability in America. 87% of the cases are ischemic strokes, which results from blockage in the artery of the brain that carries oxygen-rich blood. The obstruction of the blood flow means the brain cannot receive necessary nutrients, such as oxygen and glucose, and remove wastes, such as carbon dioxide. miRNAs plays a role in posttranslational gene silencing by targeting genes in the pathogenesis of cerebral ischemia, such as the inflammatory, angiogenesis, and apoptotic pathway.

==== Alcoholism ====
The vital role of miRNAs in gene expression is significant to addiction, specifically alcoholism. Chronic alcohol abuse results in persistent changes in brain function mediated in part by alterations in gene expression. miRNA global regulation of many downstream genes deems significant regarding the reorganization or synaptic connections or long term neural adaptations involving the behavioral change from alcohol consumption to withdrawal and/or dependence. Up to 35 different miRNAs have been found to be altered in the alcoholic post-mortem brain, all of which target genes that include the regulation of the cell cycle, apoptosis, cell adhesion, nervous system development and cell signaling. Altered miRNA levels were found in the medial prefrontal cortex of alcohol-dependent mice, suggesting the role of miRNA in orchestrating translational imbalances and the creation of differentially expressed proteins within an area of the brain where complex cognitive behavior and decision making likely originate.

miRNAs can be either upregulated or downregulated in response to chronic alcohol use. miR-206 expression increased in the prefrontal cortex of alcohol-dependent rats, targeting the transcription factor brain-derived neurotrophic factor (BDNF) and ultimately reducing its expression. BDNF plays a critical role in the formation and maturation of new neurons and synapses, suggesting a possible implication in synapse growth/synaptic plasticity in alcohol abusers. miR-155, important in regulating alcohol-induced neuroinflammation responses, was found to be upregulated, suggesting the role of microglia and inflammatory cytokines in alcohol pathophysiology. Downregulation of miR-382 was found in the nucleus accumbens, a structure in the basal forebrain significant in regulating feelings of reward that power motivational habits. miR-382 is the target for the dopamine receptor D1 (DRD1), and its overexpression results in the upregulation of DRD1 and delta fosB, a transcription factor that activates a series of transcription events in the nucleus accumbens that ultimately result in addictive behaviors. Alternatively, overexpressing miR-382 resulted in attenuated drinking and the inhibition of DRD1 and delta fosB upregulation in rat models of alcoholism, demonstrating the possibility of using miRNA-targeted pharmaceuticals in treatments.

=== Obesity ===
miRNAs play crucial roles in the regulation of stem cell progenitors differentiating into adipocytes. Studies to determine what role pluripotent stem cells play in adipogenesis, were examined in the immortalized human bone marrow-derived stromal cell line hMSC-Tert20. Decreased expression of miR-155, miR-221, and miR-222, have been found during the adipogenic programming of both immortalized and primary hMSCs, suggesting that they act as negative regulators of differentiation. Conversely, ectopic expression of the miRNAs 155, 221, and 222 significantly inhibited adipogenesis and repressed induction of the master regulators PPARγ and CCAAT/enhancer-binding protein alpha (CEBPA). This paves the way for possible genetic obesity treatments.

Another class of miRNAs that regulate insulin resistance, obesity, and diabetes, is the let-7 family. Let-7 accumulates in human tissues during the course of aging. When let-7 was ectopically overexpressed to mimic accelerated aging, mice became insulin-resistant, and thus more prone to high fat diet-induced obesity and diabetes. In contrast when let-7 was inhibited by injections of let-7-specific antagomirs, mice become more insulin-sensitive and remarkably resistant to high fat diet-induced obesity and diabetes. Not only could let-7 inhibition prevent obesity and diabetes, it could also reverse and cure the condition. These experimental findings suggest that let-7 inhibition could represent a new therapy for obesity and type 2 diabetes.

=== Hemostasis ===
miRNAs also play crucial roles in the regulation of complex enzymatic cascades including the hemostatic blood coagulation system. Large scale studies of functional miRNA targeting have recently uncovered rationale therapeutic targets in the hemostatic system. They have been directly linked to Calcium homeostasis in the endoplasmic reticulum, which is critical in cell differentiation in early development.

== Plants ==
miRNAs are considered to be key regulators of many developmental, homeostatic, and immune processes in plants. Their roles in plant development include shoot apical meristem development, leaf growth, flower formation, seed production, or root expansion. In addition, they play a complex role in responses to various abiotic stresses comprising heat stress, low-temperature stress, drought stress, light stress, or gamma radiation exposure.

== Viruses ==
Viral microRNAs play an important role in the regulation of gene expression of viral and/or host genes to benefit the virus. Hence, miRNAs play a key role in host–virus interactions and pathogenesis of viral diseases. The expression of transcription activators by human herpesvirus-6 DNA is believed to be regulated by viral miRNA.

== Target prediction ==
miRNAs can bind to target messenger RNA (mRNA) transcripts of protein-coding genes and negatively control their translation or cause mRNA degradation. It is of key importance to identify the miRNA targets accurately. A comparison of the predictive performance of eighteen in silico algorithms is available. Large scale studies of functional miRNA targeting suggest that many functional miRNAs can be missed by target prediction algorithms.

== See also ==
- Anti-miRNA oligonucleotides
- C19MC miRNA cluster
- Gene expression
- List of miRNA gene prediction tools
- List of miRNA target prediction tools
- MicroDNA
- MicroRNA Biosensors
- MiRNEST
- MIR222
- miR-324-5p
- Mir-M7 microRNA precursor family
- RNA interference
- Small interfering RNA
- Small nucleolar RNA-derived microRNA
