= MiR-205 =

Micro RNA involved in the regulation of multiple genes

mir-205
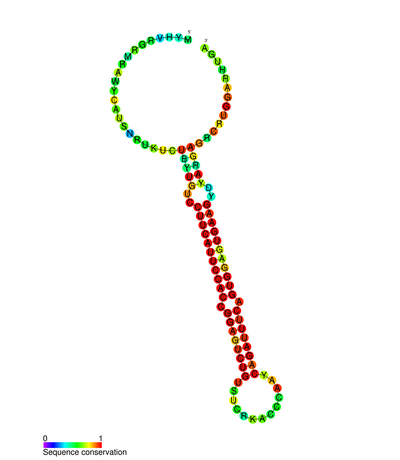
- miR-205 microRNA secondary structure and sequence conservation

Identifiers
- Symbol: mir-205
- Rfam: RF00656
- miRBase family: MIPF0000058
- NCBI Gene: 406988
- HGNC: 31583
- OMIM: 613147

Other data
- RNA type: microRNA
- Domain(s): Eukaryota; Euteleostomi;
- PDB structures: PDBe

In molecular biology miR-205 microRNA is a short RNA molecule. MicroRNAs function to regulate the expression levels of other genes by several mechanisms. They are involved in numerous cellular processes, including development, proliferation, and apoptosis. Currently, it is believed that miRNAs elicit their effect by silencing the expression of target genes.

The miR-200 family (miR-200a, miR-200b, miR-200c, miR-141 and miR-429) and miR-205 are frequently silenced in advanced cancer. Studies has shown that—by targeting the transcriptional repressors of E-cadherin, ZEB1 and ZEB2 miR-205 is involved in epithelial to mesenchymal transition (EMT) and tumor invasion.

Recently, miR-200 silencing was also reported in cancer stem cells, implying that miR-200 deregulation is a key event in multiple levels of tumor biology. The cause of miR-200 silencing in naturally occurring cancer cells, however, remains largely unknown.

== Genomic locations ==
Members of miR-200 family including miR -205 are found clustered at two locations in the human genome : 1142000 – 1144500 in chromosome 1 and 6942000 – 6944500 in chromosome 12. Short genomic distance between members suggests that they may function collaboratively and are highly related in sequence.

== miR-205 targets ==
- N-chimaerin
- ERBB3
- E2F1
- E2F5
- ZEB1
- ZEB2
- Cepsilon
- VEGF-A
- IL24
- IL32
- CCNJ

== Role of miR-205 in cancer ==
Studies have demonstrated that miR-205 has a role in both normal development and cancer.

=== Breast cancer ===
miR-205 was found to be highly expressed in stem cell-enriched populations from the mouse mammary gland, and thus may play a function in normal mammary stem cell maintenance.

An increasing amount of experimental evidence shows that microRNAs can have a causal role in breast cancer tumorigenesis as a novel class of oncogenes or tumor suppressor genes, depending on the targets they regulate. It was found down-modulated in breast tumors compared with normal breast tissue. miR-205 expression is associated with survival in breast cancer. Patients with higher expression have higher probability of survival. This down regulation was also observed in breast cancer cell lines, including MCF-7 and MDA-MB-231 compared to the non-malignant cell line MCF-10A. It directly targets HER3 receptor, vascular endothelial growth factor A (VEGF-A) through interaction with putative binding site in the 3'-untranslated region (3'-UTR) of ErbB3 and VEGF-A. miR-205 inhibits the activation of the downstream mediator Akt. miR-205 was found to be able to interfere with the proliferative pathway mediated by HER receptor family.

Ectopic expression of miR-205 significantly inhibits cell proliferation and anchorage independent growth, as well as cell invasion. Furthermore, miR-205 was shown to suppress lung metastasis in an animal model.

=== Prostate cancer ===
Research has shown that miR-205 was significantly down-regulated in prostate cancer compared with match normal tissue. Its re-expression induced apoptosis and cell cycle arrest and resulted in a mesenchymal-to-epithelial transition, such as up-regulation of E-cadherin and reduction of cell locomotion and invasion, and in the down-regulation of several oncogenes known to be involved in disease progression (i.e., interleukin 6, caveolin-1, EZH2).

It also impaired cell growth, migration, clonability, and invasiveness of prostate cancer cells. Micro-RNA-205 induced the expression of tumor suppressor genes IL-24 and IL-32 at both the messenger RNA and protein levels.

miR-205 exerts a tumor-suppressive effect in human prostate by counteracting epithelial-to-mesenchymal transition and reducing cell migration/invasion, at least in part through the down-regulation of protein kinase Cepsilon. miR-205 activated tumor suppressor genes by targeting specific sites in their promoters. These results corroborate a newly identified function that miRNAs have in regulating gene expression at the transcriptional level. The specific activation of tumor suppressor genes (e.g., IL-24, IL-32) or other dysregulated genes by miRNA may contribute to a novel therapeutic approach for the treatment of prostate cancer.

=== Bladder cancer ===
From a study on transcriptional regulation of the miR-200 and miR-205 loci in bladder tumors and bladder cell lines, the miR-200 and miR-205 loci were found specifically silenced and gain promoter hypermethylation and repressive chromatin marks in muscle invasive bladder tumors and undifferentiated bladder cell lines. miR-200c expression is significantly correlated with early stage T1 bladder tumor progression, and propose miR-200 and miR-205 silencing and DNA hypermethylation as possible prognostic markers in bladder cancer.

=== Lung cancer ===
has-miR-205 was identified as a highly specific marker for squamous cell lung carcinoma. Has-miR-205 is a highly accurate marker for lung cancer of squamous histology. Diagnostic assay can provide highly accurate subclassification of NSCLC patients.

=== Colorectal cancer ===
Mir-205 has been found to be significantly deregulated in colorectal cancer. Elevated expression levels of miR-205 have been shown to be associated with mucinous colorectal cancers and mucin-producing ulcerative colitis-associated colon cancers, but not with sporadic colonic adenocarcinoma that lack mucinous components. Overexpression of miR-205 in an intestinal epithelial cell line (Caco-2 subclone) promoted accumulation of mucus-secreting goblet cell-like cells and mucin production and MUC2 mRNA expression were enhanced in-vitro.

== Cellular and molecular biological functions ==
It is still not clear how miR-205 plays in directing stem cell fate. A study on mammary-gland stem or progenitor cells showed that miR-205 over expression led to an expansion of the progenitor-cell population, decreased cell size and increased cellular proliferation.

Research also shows miR-205 might regulate the expression of the tumor-suppressor protein PTEN. Several other putative and previously validated miR-205 targets include ZEB1 and ZEB2.

Inhibition of microRNA-205 increased the number of phosphorylated FAK and phosphorylated Pax, and decreased filamentous actin. microRNA-205 has down-regulating effect on cell motility in NHCEKs.

microRNA-205 (miR-205) and miR-184 coordinately regulate the lipid phosphatase SHIP2 for Akt survival signaling in keratinocytes.

miR-205 also interacts with a specific target in the 3'-UTR sequence of MED1, which plays an important role in placental development, and silences MED1 expression in human trophoblasts exposed to hypoxia.

== Potentials in clinical applications ==
microRNA (miRNA) expression profiles are being intensively investigated for their involvement in carcinogenesis.

Detection of metastatic head and neck squamous cell carcinoma

The presence of cervical lymph node metastases in head and neck squamous cell carcinoma (HNSCC) is the strongest determinant of patient prognosis. Owing to the impact of nodal metastases on patient survival, a system for sensitive and accurate detection is required. Studies has shown that the expression of microRNA-205 (miR-205) is highly specific for squamous epithelium and can be used as a molecular marker for the detection of metastatic HNSCC.

== See also ==
- MicroRNA
