= Hua-Enhancer1 =

RNA methyltransferase protein

Hua-Enhancer1 (HE1) is a RNA methyltransferase protein that plays a role in the maturation of miRNA in plants. HE1 methylates the 3' overhangs of miRNA:miRNA* duplexes, before they are exported out of the nucleus to the cytoplasm.
