= MiRNEST =

miRNEST

Content
- Description: microRNA search and annotation.
- Organisms: plant and virus

Contact
- Research center: Adam Mickiewicz University
- Laboratory: Laboratory of Bioinformatics
- Authors: Michal Wojciech Szczesniak
- Primary citation: Szczesniak & al. (2012)
- Release date: 2011

Access
- Website: http://mirnest.amu.edu.pl

miRNEST is database of animal, plant and virus microRNAs.

== See also ==
- microRNAs
