= MIR222 =

Non-coding RNA in the species Homo sapiens

Identifiers
- Aliases: MIR222, MIRN222, miRNA222, mir-222, microRNA 222
- External IDs: OMIM: 300569; GeneCards: MIR222; OMA:MIR222 - orthologs

Gene location (Human)
Chr.	X chromosome (human)
Band	Xp11.3	Start	45,747,015 bp
Band	Xp11.3	End	45,747,124 bp
RNA expression pattern
Bgee	Human / Mouse (ortholog); Top expressed in: islet of Langerhans; placenta; monocyte; tibial arteries; bone marrow; blood; human kidney; gastrocnemius muscle; body of uterus; mucosa of esophagus / n/a; More reference expression data
BioGPS	n/a
Orthologs
Species	Human	Mouse
Entrez	407007	n/a
Ensembl	ENSG00000207725	n/a
UniProt	n a	n/a
RefSeq (mRNA)	n/a	n/a
RefSeq (protein)	n/a	n/a
Location (UCSC)	Chr X: 45.75 – 45.75 Mb	n/a
PubMed search		n/a
- Wikidata
View/Edit Human

MicroRNA 222 is a MicroRNA that in humans is encoded by the MIR222 gene, and is a known extracellular RNA (exRNA).

== Function ==
microRNAs (miRNAs) are short (20-24 nt) non-coding RNAs that are involved in post-transcriptional regulation of gene expression in multicellular organisms by affecting both the stability and translation of mRNAs. miRNAs are transcribed by RNA polymerase II as part of capped and polyadenylated primary transcripts (pri-miRNAs) that can be either protein-coding or non-coding.

The primary transcript is cleaved by the Drosha ribonuclease III enzyme to produce an approximately 70-nt stem-loop precursor miRNA (pre-miRNA), which is further cleaved by the cytoplasmic Dicer ribonuclease to generate the mature miRNA and antisense miRNA star (miRNA*) products.

The mature miRNA is incorporated into a RNA-induced silencing complex (RISC), which recognizes target mRNAs through imperfect base pairing with the miRNA and most commonly results in translational inhibition or destabilization of the target mRNA. The RefSeq represents the predicted microRNA stem-loop.
