= Mir-M7 microRNA precursor family =

RNA molecule

mir-M7

Identifiers
- Symbol: mir-M7
- Rfam: RF01009
- miRBase family: MIPF0000526

Other data
- RNA type: microRNA
- Domain(s): Eukaryota;
- PDB structures: PDBe

In molecular biology mir-M7 microRNA is a short RNA molecule. MicroRNAs function to regulate the expression levels of other genes by several mechanisms.

== See also ==
- MicroRNA
