= MicroRNA biosensors =

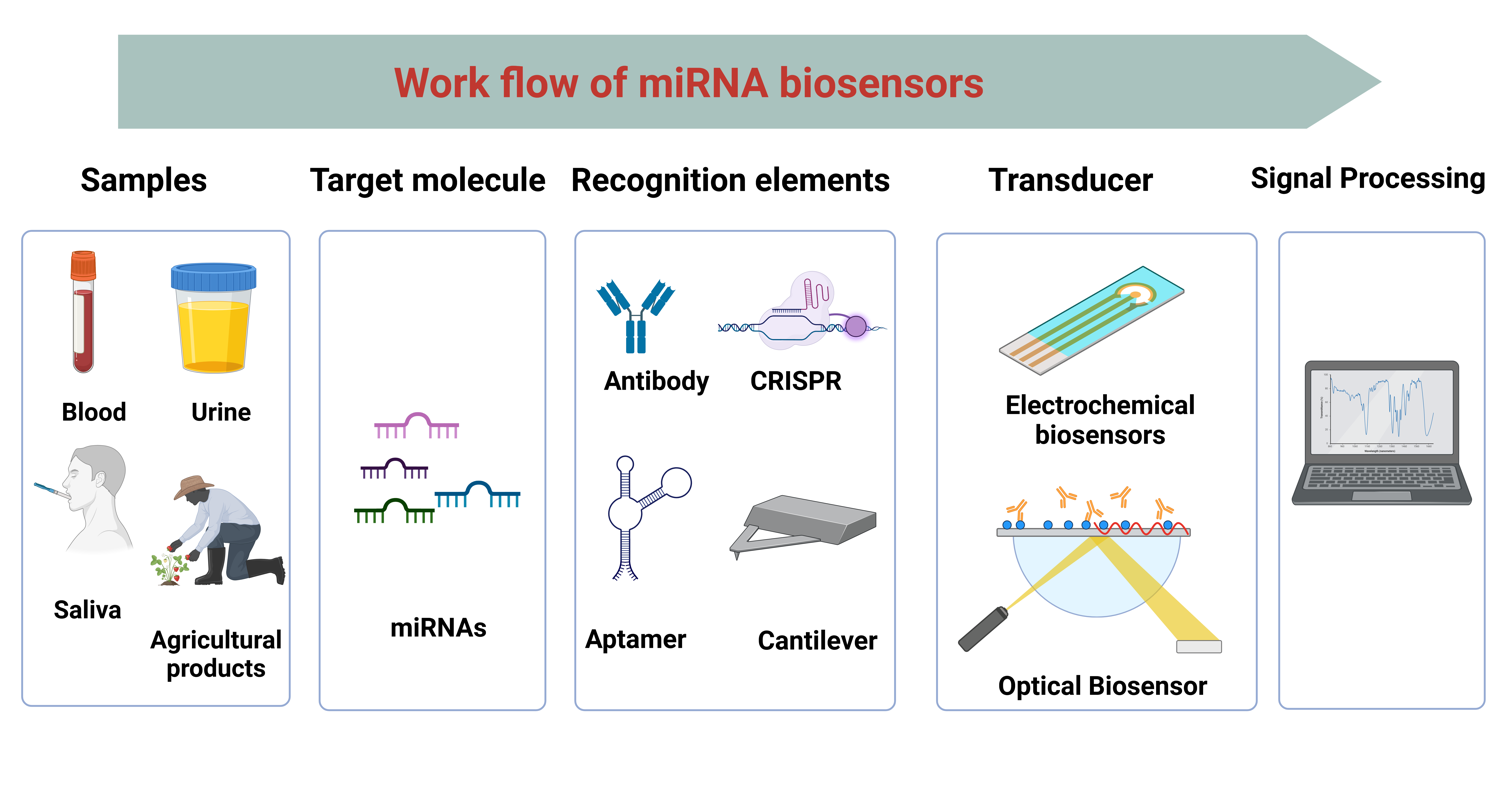
Figure illustrating the workflow of miRNA detection. miRNAs can be detected with complex biosensors such as electrochemical biosensors and optical biosensors. miRNA Biosensors utilize nanomaterials, recognition elements, and amplification elements for sensitive and specific detection of miRNAs.

MicroRNA (miRNA) biosensors are analytical devices that involve interactions between the target miRNA strands and recognition element on a detection platform to produce signals that can be measured to indicate levels or the presence of the target miRNA. Research into miRNA biosensors shows shorter readout times, increased sensitivity and specificity of miRNA detection and lower fabrication costs than conventional miRNA detection methods.

miRNAs are a category of small, non-coding RNAs in the range of 18-25 base pairs in length. miRNAs regulate cellular processes such as gene regulation post-transcriptionally, and are abundant in body fluids such as saliva, urine and circulatory fluids such as blood. Also, miRNAs are found in animals and plants and have regulatory functions that affect cellular mechanisms. miRNAs are highly associated with diseases such as cancers and cardiovascular diseases. In cancer, miRNAs have oncogenic or tumor suppressor roles and are promising biomarkers for disease diagnosis and prognosis. Many techniques exist in clinical and research settings for analyzing miRNA biomarkers. However, inherent limitations with current methods, such as high cost, time and personnel training requirements, and low detection sensitivity and specificity, create the need for improved miRNA detection methods.

== Background ==
miRNAs are associated with physiological and pathological processes; hence, measuring them in fields like human health, agriculture, and environmental testing is in demand. Here are some key aspects of the necessity of detection of miRNAs:

- Potential biomarkers: miRNAs have specific expression in diseases such as cancer, cardiovascular diseases, and autoimmune diseases, which can be beneficial for early detection, prognosis and monitoring for response to treatments. Furthermore, because miRNAs are in body fluids like urine, saliva, and blood, detecting miRNAs is less invasive than methods such as biopsies. This is more comfortable for patients and can facilitate more frequent monitoring of their disease.
- Molecular mechanisms: As miRNAs have regulatory roles in gene expression and signaling pathways, studying them can give the etiology of diseases and targeting them can provide therapeutic options.
- Personalized medicine: Because the specific expression of miRNAs offers a promising avenue for enhancing personalized medicine, they provide a deeper understanding of individual disease risk, treatment response, and prognosis, which help clinicians make better informed clinical decisions.

== History of miRNA detection technology ==
=== Early and current detection methods ===
The first miRNA (lin-4) was detected by Victor Ambros in Caenorhabditis elegans in 1993. The first detection method was Northern blotting (1977), which had low sensitivity. Following that was Reverse Transcription Polymerase Chain Reaction (RT-PCR) (1990), which had high detection sensitivity.

- Northern Blotting: Northern blotting involves hybridizing miRNA probes (short nucleic acid sequences) with miRNAs, followed by their separation on a gel and transfer to a membrane. The probes are labeled with radioactive isotopes (raising safety and environmental concerns), enzymes, or fluorescent markers. The quantity of RNA present is inferred from the probe signal's intensity. While Northern Blotting is highly specific and helpful for validating high-throughput methods like RNA-seq, it requires a large sample volume, is time-consuming, and lacks precision in quantification analysis.
- Real-Time Reverse Transcription–Polymerase Chain Reaction (Real-time RT-PCR): This method starts with converting miRNA into cDNA using reverse transcriptase enzymes. The cDNA is then amplified using sequence-specific primers, a process monitored by fluorescent dyes or probes. Real-time RT-PCR is noted for its sensitivity and specificity. However, it faces challenges such as the need for standardization, technical complexities (e.g., primer design, sample preparation), time-intensive processes, and high costs.

High-throughput Methods:

- Microarrays (1990): Microarrays enable the detection of thousands of miRNAs in a single experiment. They consist of a solid surface to which complementary miRNA sequences are attached. Introducing miRNAs allows them to bind to these probes, with the amount of miRNA measured by the fluorescence intensity. Microarrays are cost-effective compared to real-time RT-PCR and NGS but have limitations in detecting low quantities of miRNAs and distinguishing between miRNAs with similar sequences.
- Next Generation Sequencing (NGS) (2005): NGS begins with RNA extraction and reverse transcription into cDNA, followed by adaptor ligation and amplification. The cDNA is then sequenced on an NGS platform, producing millions of short reads. Expert bioinformaticians and sophisticated tools must align and analyze the data and map reads to reference miRNA sequences for miRNA discovery and identification. NGS offers high sensitivity and specificity for detecting low-quantity miRNAs and identifying miRNAs differing by a single nucleotide.

== Principles of microRNA biosensors ==
Three essential elements make up miRNA biosensors:

- Biological recognition element: they can detect specific target molecules and have different types, including antibodies, antigens, DNA/RNA, aptamers, enzymes, and MIPs (molecularly imprinted polymers).
- Transducer: following recognition, the transducer is an element required to convert changes in the recognition element to a measurable signal. Based on the type of signal they produce, they are categorized into electrochemical, optical, and mechanical transducers.
- Signal processor: computational elements that amplify and process the signals produced from transducers and can be demonstrated by numerical values and digital readouts.

=== Specificity in miRNA detection ===
The term "specificity" in the context of miRNA biosensors refers to the ability of the biosensor to identify a particular miRNA within a sample that contains various components and miRNAs with similar sequences. The challenge in achieving this specificity derives from the small size of miRNAs, which may differ from each other by only one nucleotide. Consequently, designing biosensors capable of precisely recognizing the target miRNA is essential.

=== Sensitivity in miRNA detection ===
Sensitivity in miRNA biosensors refers to their ability to detect target miRNAs in low concentrations within samples. Since miRNAs are typically found in small amounts, biosensors are engineered to identify concentrations as low as femtomolar (10^-15) or attomolar (10^-18) levels. Achieving such high sensitivity involves enhancements to recognition elements, amplification, and signal processing techniques. The LoD (limit of detection) is used to determine the concrete value of sensitivity in biosensors, which indicates the lowest concentration of miRNA that can be separated from the background (zero) signal with a specified level of confidence.

The dynamic range in miRNA biosensors refers to the concentrations over which the biosensor can accurately detect the target miRNAs, extending from the lowest detectable LoD to the maximum concentration that can be measured without necessitating sample dilution.

== Types of microRNA biosensors ==
=== Electrochemical biosensors ===
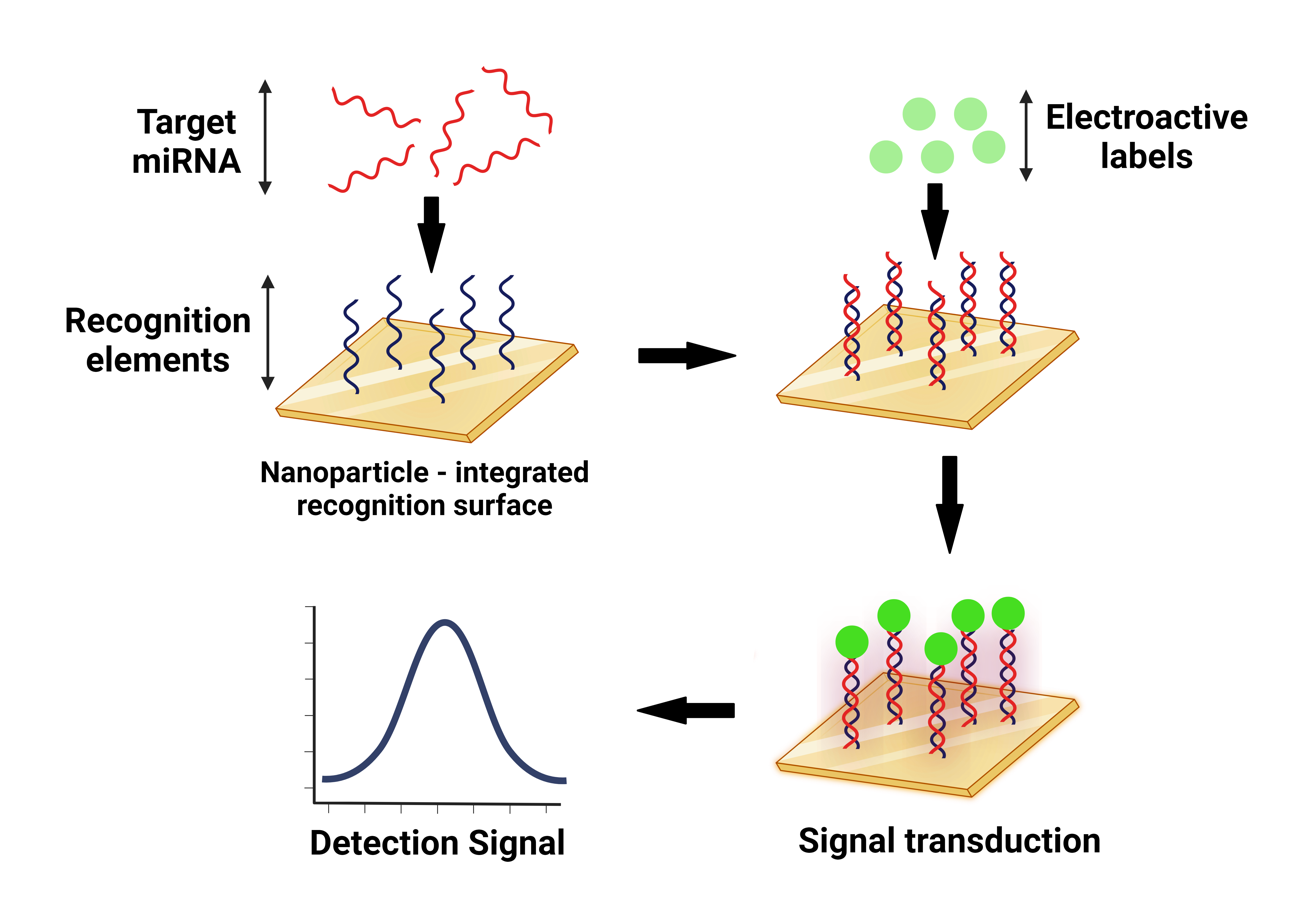
General mechanism of a label-based electrochemical miRNA biosensor.

Electrochemical biosensors present significant advantages to miRNA detection over conventional miRNA analysis methods. Using simple electronics reduces production costs and increases ease of use in portable system configurations. This allows for a broader scope of use, including environmental, clinical and food analysis applications.

miRNA electrochemical biosensor detection relies on measuring the changes in the electrode-property or electroactive compound redox signal in the transduction of electrochemically active reporter species and hybridization between the target miRNA and complementary probe. Various materials can be made into the transduction element, including silver, gold, graphite or nanoparticle variations of such materials. Detection of electrochemical property changes allows for real-time analysis and kinetics data, an advantage biosensor methods such as optical biosensors lack. Light pollution is not a limitation of electrochemical miRNA biosensors. However, amplification techniques such as rolling circle amplification (RCA) may be required when miRNA concentrations are insufficient to produce an electrical signal.

==== 1. Voltammetric and amperometric electrochemical biosensors ====
Electrochemical miRNA biosensors can be designed to infer voltammetric or amperometric measurements. Upon hybridization of the miRNA target with its complementary probe sequence, voltammetric miRNA biosensors detect the change in current based on a controlled increase or decrease in electric potential on the detection platform. Amperometric-based biosensors detect the change in electric current at a fixed positive electric potential. Recent developments in voltammetric and amperometric miRNA biosensors can be classified as label-based or label-free biosensors, indicating whether or not electroactive labels on the miRNA target are used as the naming suggests.

- Voltammetric and amperometric label-free (direct detection) miRNA biosensors

First published in 2009, label-free (direct detection) electrochemical miRNA biosensors function without labelling the target miRNA with electrocatalytic nanoparticle tags or hybridization indicators. Label-free miRNA biosensors were initially based on DNA detection through guanine electrooxidation measurements, with the lower detection limit being 5 nM of miRNA. Since then, electrode materials have been developed to increase the sensitivity of detection down to less than 1 pM, such as with graphene and ionic-liquid modified electrodes. For example, Wu et al. (2013) increased the conductivity of the electrode surface of an amperometric biosensor with a multilayer consisting of Nafion, thionine and palladium nanoparticles, which immobilized the target miRNA on the electrode surface for a lower limit of detection of 1.87 pM. Label-free miRNA biosensors detect signals before and after the hybridization of electroactive nucleic acid bases. For instance, doxorubicin-loaded gold nanoparticles (AuNps) have been integrated with a double-loop hairpin probe that hybridizes with the target miRNA to form heteroduplexes, in which duplex specific nucleases hydrolyze DNA in the heteroduplex structures to release target miRNA strands for amplification in a signal amplification system. The limit of detection in such a system is 0.17pM.

- Voltammetric and amperometric label-based (indirect detection) miRNA biosensors

Label-based (indirect detection) electrochemical miRNA biosensors require electrocatalytic or redox active molecule or nanoparticle labelling of the miRNA target or complementary capture probes for detection. Generally, label-based approaches offer significantly greater sensitivity of miRNA detection than label-free methods, with sensitivity reaching the fM-aM range.

An example is AuNp-superlattice-based miRNA biosensors utilizing the small molecule cationic dye toluidine blue to detect miRNA-21. Toluidine blue acts as a miRNA intercalative label through electrostatic interaction with the negatively charged backbone phosphate groups. On the biosensor, toluidine blue is a redox indicator to measure the oxidation peak current of toluidine blue and indicated hybridization of miRNA. The LoD levels reached 78 aM.

==== 2. Amplification (enzyme)-based electrochemical miRNA biosensors ====
Electrochemical detection or amplification strategies for miRNA biosensors have been developed using enzyme-based methods. Amplification of miRNA is often a necessary component of biosensor detection as miRNA concentrations are found in low abundance, and amplification of target miRNA strands will increase the sensitivity of detection. Additionally, inherent properties of miRNA include short strand length and high sequence homology, which present a challenge with detection sensitivity and specificity.

Various methods, such as duplex-specific nuclease enzymes and polymerase extension, can amplify miRNA targets to reach LoD in the fM range. Isothermal amplification techniques are widely used enzyme-based miRNA amplification techniques, given the advantages of cost and time-reduction associated with ease of use compared to polymerase chain reaction (PCR) methods. Isothermal methods amplify nucleic acids at a constant temperature, which removes the thermal cycling requirement as used in PCR and does not require specific enzymes for spatial recognition sites in the target miRNA. A commonly used isothermal technique for miRNA detection is rolling circle amplification (RCA). In the RCA of miRNA targets, the miRNA binds to a complementary circular DNA template, which is continuously and exponentially amplified through the synthesis of long single-stranded DNA. Research with gold electrode electrochemical biosensors has shown that RCA initiated on the electrode has provided LoD levels of 50 aM. RCA's isothermal nature and ease of use allow it to be used in clinical diagnostic and resource-lacking laboratory settings and in point-of-care biosensor devices.

=== Optical miRNA biosensors ===
Upon hybridization of the target miRNA tagged with a nucleic acid probe and an optically active reporter, label-based optical biosensors transduce the absorbance or fluorescence optical signal into quantifiable data. The reporters can be either quantum dots or dye labels. On the other hand, label-free optical miRNA biosensors detect changes in the refractive index (RI) at the recognition element, which are caused by the binding of the target miRNA to its bioreceptor. The electromagnetic field probes the RI changes, characterized as an evanescent wave. The electromagnetic fields are generated by guided or resonant optical modes that travel in the transducer element. Additionally, label-free optical miRNA biosensors are insensitive to unbound or background RNA or DNA molecules, as optical detection is confined to the sensing recognition surface. This is beneficial for miRNA detection in small volumes and is an advantage over other label-based miRNA biosensors, as signal detection is based on measuring the total number of miRNA in the sample.

- Surface Plasmon resonance-based optical miRNA biosensors

Surface plasmon resonance (SPR) based miRNA biosensors are a label-free method that detects RI changes after target miRNA binds to its probes and forms a complex. Detection involves propagating a surface plasmon wave (SPW) across the metal-dielectric interface surface layer of the biosensor in a Kretschmann configuration. The SPW decays exponentially, where the changes in the SPW propagation constant are measured as the constant is sensitive to change in the RI. A practical example of a label-based SPR-based miRNA biosensor is miR-21 detection with a LoD of 1 fM. The biosensor utilized graphene oxide–gold nanoparticles integrated with the sandwiching of the target miRNA between two DNA probes to amplify the SPR signal and have secondary hybridization through miR-21 report probes.

=== Electromechanical biosensors ===
Electromechanical biosensors represent an integration of electrical and mechanical engineering disciplines, employing a detection strategy that hinges on the hybridization of miRNAs to specific probes anchored on the sensor's surface. Subsequent alterations in parameters such as stress or mass are then transduced into electrical signals. A notable implementation involves Atomic Force Microscopy (AFM), which has successfully identified has-mir-194 and has-mir-205 in samples related to colon and bladder cancer. The underlying mechanism of this approach is AFM's ability to delineate the variations in stiffness across the gold surface of the biosensor, facilitating the detection of miRNA hybridization events. Another pivotal component in electromechanical biosensors is the gold-coated piezoelectric cantilever sensor, which is adept at recognizing hybridized miRNA. Although electromechanical biosensors are highly sensitive to miRNAs, it is difficult to measure them in samples with high amounts of different molecules.

== Nanomaterials used in miRNA biosensors ==
Nanomaterials are used for their unique characteristics to facilitate the detection of miRNAs. Here, we discuss some features of nanomaterials used in miRNA biosensors.

- Gold nanoparticles (AuNps): AuNps enhance miRNA detection signals and facilitate the stable conjugation of recognition elements into miRNAs. AuNps have excellent catalytic properties, conductivity, high surface area and interface energy and can be modified with molecules such as oligonucleotide aggregates for high affinity binding with specific substrates.

In electrochemical miRNA biosensors, AuNps allow for ease of functionalization for electrochemical reactions that involve changes in potential, current, conductivity, or impedance in detecting target miRNA binding on the detection surface. In optical biosensors, AuNps exhibit unique and tunable optical properties beneficial for SPR miRNA biosensors. When AuNps are exposed to light, propagating surface plasmons needed for detecting receptor-bonded miRNAs are created from a resonant interaction between the electromagnetic field of light and the electron-charged oscillations on the metal surface. This is due to AuNps exhibiting a high density of conduction band electrons and its nanoparticle size allowing multiple angular shifts for more reflectance angles.

- Graphene: Graphene is a member of the carbon nanomaterials family and stands out for its biocompatibility, electrical conductivity, light molecular weight, stability, and affordability, making it an exceptional choice for miRNA biosensor applications. It demonstrates excellent responsiveness to chemical, optical, and mechanical stimuli. Graphene is predominantly utilized in electrical and optical miRNA biosensors. A notable recent application involves using laser-induced self-N-doped porous graphene in miRNA biosensors, capable of detecting miRNA hsa-miR-486-5p at concentrations as low as 10 fM. This approach combines cost-effectiveness with high reproducibility, offering significant advantages for conditions like preeclampsia.
- Terahertz (THz) Metamaterial with Gold Nanoparticles: THz metamaterial is artificially synthesized and designed to interact with THz frequency waves. When combined with AuNps and after binding with target miRNA, they produce higher changes in THz spectral regions. For instance, a miRNA biosensor based on these materials could detect the miRNA-21 from clinical samples with a LoD of 14.54 aM.

== Technologies and principles of multiplex miRNA biosensors ==
Multiplex miRNA biosensors are designed to detect multiple types of miRNAs simultaneously with high specificity and sensitivity. This capability is essential for several reasons: First, it allows for detecting various miRNAs within a single sample that may contribute to disease, enabling comprehensive monitoring during treatment while facilitating high-throughput screening. Second, it can significantly reduce cost and time by allowing the simultaneous analysis of data from multiple miRNAs. Here are some recent technologies in multiplex miRNA biosensors:

- DNA-PAINT based using a DNA origami-based sensor platform - this miRNA biosensor has a unique geometric barcoding system and can detect up to 4 miRNAs at the same time. The 52 nm distance intervals between strands enable the platform to distinguish between single mismatches to the LoD of 11 fM to 388 fM.
- CRISPR-Multiplex Biosensor- this platform utilizes various technologies, including electrochemical microfluidics and Cas13a, to enable the amplification-free detection of eight miRNAs. It features a design with four divided channels for electrochemical analysis.

== Applications ==
=== Diagnostic and prognostic applications ===
Since the initial discovery of miRNAs, large databases of miRNAs have been identified in humans, plants and animals. As many miRNAs are associated with disease onset and development, miRNAs are a suitable biomarker for biosensor detection in clinical settings. Considerations must be taken into account of the biological sample source for miRNA targets. Clinical miRNA sample analysis commonly comes in blood, plasma, serum, seminal fluid, saliva, urine, and tissue-derived miRNAs. In the context of cancer, biosensor detection of miRNAs is most conveniently performed in the form of liquid biopsies, as circulatory miRNAs are found in the highest abundance in liquid samples.

- Point-of-Care (POC) testing

Research into POC diagnostic tests has resulted in the development of microfluidic biosensors capable of early diagnostic clinical analysis of cancer-associated miRNAs, which produce cost- and time-efficient results with increased sensitivity and specificity over traditional methods. Liquid biopsy droplet-based microfluidic biosensors can be fabricated into POC devices for ease of use by integrating with pre-existing devices and interfaces and can extend utilization beyond traditional laboratory settings and those without sophisticated instruments. An example of developments in POC testing for prostate cancer is where miR-21 in low concentrations of urine samples was detected with a limit of detection of 2 nM on screen-printed, label-based electrochemical biosensor chips. Detection was rapid, with results produced in less than two hours.

=== Agriculture management ===
Besides clinical usage, miRNA biosensors have been adapted for managing agriculture plant stress and growth and disease analysis, as plant miRNAs are associated with growth regulatory mechanisms. An example is electrochemical biosensors fabricated for detecting miR-319a, a miRNA associated with phytohormone response that regulates rice seedling growth regulation. Isothermal alkaline phosphatase catalytic signal amplification of the target miRNA strands was integrated with a three-electrode system to detect miR319a to LoD levels of 1.7 fM. AuNp label-based optical biosensors were tested for detecting miRNA-1886, an indicator of drought stress in tomato plants. They found that decreasing irrigation levels increased the concentration of miRNA-1886 at a range of 100 to 6800 fM.

=== Research applications ===
==== 1. Molecular and cellular biology ====
As miRNAs are one of the main regulators of genes, detection and measuring them in cells and molecular levels can be helpful to decipher miRNA interactions with other molecules. For instance, a study by Bandi et al. found that miR-15a and miR-16 function in tumorigenesis of non-small cell lung cancer (NSCLC) cell lines. miRNA biosensors also have a significant role in the elucidation of disease mechanisms. For example, a study on cardiovascular diseases found that miRNA biosensors based on DNA tetrahedron nanostructure can recognize miR-133a in aM levels, which is helpful for further studies on myocardial infarction.

==== 2. Drug discovery and development ====
Because of their high-throughput potential, miRNA biosensors can significantly accelerate drug discovery by evaluating various drugs on miRNA expression levels to observe which drug can target unregulated miRNAs in diseases. Furthermore, miRNA biosensors can monitor the expression of miRNA expression in real-time to observe which changes happen in different concentrations of drugs, and this is especially crucial in early-phase clinical trials for drug dosage optimization. In addition, by testing various miRNA expressions, researchers can discover relations between diseases and miRNAs' expression

== Limitations to miRNA biosensors ==
While miRNA biosensors hold considerable promise for miRNA detection, several critical challenges must be addressed:

- Sensitivity and Specificity: The low abundance of miRNAs in complex biological samples, such as blood, necessitates enhancing biosensor sensitivity to detect miRNAs at levels beyond femtomolar concentrations. Additionally, due to the high sequence similarity among miRNAs, improving the specificity of these biosensors is essential to differentiate between miRNAs based on single nucleotide differences.
- Sample Preparation: Extracting miRNAs from samples presents significant difficulties. The process is complex and requires optimization to ensure the purity and integrity of the miRNAs for accurate detection.
- Stability of miRNA Biosensor: The stability of miRNA biosensors is compromised by environmental conditions, particularly for components like aptamers and antibodies. This issue is especially pertinent for point-of-care (POC) devices, which require robustness and longevity to be effectively used in various settings.
- Standardization: A significant limitation in the field is the absence of standardized guidelines and universal reference miRNAs for comparing results across blood and plasma samples. Establishing reliable normalizers, characterized by consistent expression and stability across all samples, is crucial for accurately interpreting miRNA levels.

Addressing these challenges is essential for advancing and adopting miRNA biosensor technologies.

== Future directions ==
The significance of miRNA in diagnostics and the recent advancements in miRNA detection from various sample sources, particularly in clinical settings, underscore the need for enhancing miRNA biosensor technologies. The future of miRNA biosensor optimization encompasses several key areas:

- Furthering nanomaterial integration research: The materials, including graphene, gold nanoparticles, and quantum dots, can significantly improve the biosensors' specificity and sensitivity, making them more effective in detecting miRNAs.
- Multiplex detection: Efforts are underway to refine miRNA biosensors for the simultaneous detection of multiple miRNA types, especially those within the same family, from small-volume samples; in this regard, artificial intelligence can aid in distinguishing between miRNA types and correlating them with clinical outcomes. Such advancements would be particularly beneficial for point-of-care (POC) devices, simplifying sample preparation, enhancing user-friendliness, and enabling physicians to monitor miRNA levels in real-time remotely.
- Encapsulation technologies: Encapsulation technologies aim to safeguard the biosensors' sensitive components from environmental threats, ensuring their durability and reliability.
- Standardization of miRNA research and development: The development of standardized guidelines and the identification of universal genes for miRNA expression comparison will facilitate the accurate evaluation of miRNA biosensors across different clinical scenarios.
- Clinical Sample Analysis: The study of prospective and retrospective analyses of clinical samples and comparing miRNA biosensor results with those obtained via real-time qPCR and sequencing technologies can assess biosensor performance under varied clinical conditions.

These advancements suggest a focused trajectory for miRNA biosensor development, aiming at technological enhancements that promise improved diagnostic capabilities and clinical applications.
