= MirGeneDB =

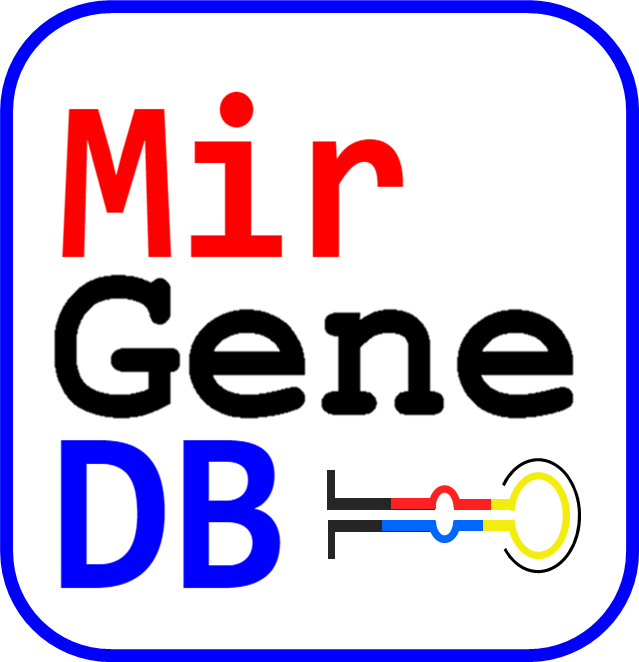
- MirGeneDB2.0

Content
- Description: MirGeneDB is a database of manually curated microRNA genes that have been validated and annotated by experts.

Contact
- Research center: Arctic University of Norway, Science for Life Laboratory, Oslo University Hospital, Dartmouth College
- Authors: Bastian Fromm & Kevin J. Peterson
- Primary citation: Bastian Fromm, Eirik Høye, Diana Domanska, Xiangfu Zhong, Ernesto Aparicio-Puerta, Vladimir Ovchinnikov, Sinan U Umu, Peter J Chabot, Wenjing Kang, Morteza Aslanzadeh, Marcel Tarbier, Emilio Mármol-Sánchez, Gianvito Urgese, Morten Johansen, Eivind Hovig, Michael Hackenberg, Marc R Friedländer, Kevin J Peterson, MirGeneDB 2.1: toward a complete sampling of all major animal phyla, Nucleic Acids Research, 2021, https://doi.org/10.1093/nar/gkab1101
- Release date: 2015, 2020, 2021

Access
- Website: https://www.mirgenedb.org/

Miscellaneous
- Version: 2.1
- Curation policy: manual

MirGeneDB is a database of manually curated microRNA genes that have been validated and annotated as initially described in Fromm et al. 2015 and Fromm et al. 2020. MirGeneDB 2.1 includes more than 16,000 microRNA gene entries representing more than 1,500 miRNA families from 75 metazoan species and published in the 2022 NAR database issue. All microRNAs can be browsed, searched and downloaded.

- Eutheria (Placental mammals)
  - Human (Homo sapiens) (567 genes, 268 families)
  - Rhesus monkey (Macaca mulatta) (520 genes, 235 families)
  - House mouse (Mus musculus) (452 genes, 224 families)
  - Norway rat (Rattus norvegicus) (420 genes, 189 families)
  - Guinea pig (Cavia porcellus) (402 genes, 184 families)
  - Rabbit (Oryctolagus cuniculus) (391 genes, 185 families)
  - Dog (Canis familiaris) (455 genes, 211 families)
  - Cow (Bos taurus) (459 genes, 214 families)
  - Nine-banded armadillo (Dasypus novemcinctus) (380 genes, 169 families)
  - Lesser hedgehog tenrec (Echinops telfairi) (350 genes, 166 families)
- Metatheria (Marsupial mammals)
  - Tasmanian devil (Sarcophilus harrisii) (465 genes, 161 families)
  - Gray short-tailed opossum (Monodelphis domestica) (505 genes, 171 families)
- Monotremata
  - Platypus (Ornithorhynchus anatinus) (402 genes, 149 families)
- Aves (Birds)
  - Chicken (Gallus gallus) (286 genes, 136 families)
  - Rock pigeon (Columba livia) (257 genes, 121 families)
  - Zebra finch (Taeniopygia guttata) (257 genes, 115 families)
- Crocodylia (Alligators and Crocodiles)
  - American alligator (Alligator mississippiensis) (283 genes, 113 families)
- Testudines (Turtles)
  - Western painted turtle (Chrysemys picta bellii) (301 genes, 124 families)
- Squamata (Lizards and Snakes)
  - Green anole lizard (Anolis carolinensis) (267 genes, 118 families)
  - Burmese python (Python bivittatus) (248 genes, 96 families)
  - Schlegels Japanese gecko (Gekko japonicus) (262 genes, 99 families)
- Rhynchocephalia (beak-heads)
  - Tuatara (Sphenodon punctatus) (225 genes, 102 families)
- Anura (Frogs and Toads)
  - African clawed frog (Xenopus laevis) (505 genes, 118 families)
  - Tropical clawed frog (Xenopus tropicalis) (355 genes, 106 families)
- Gymnophiona (Apoda)
  - Microcaecilia (Microcaecilia unicolor) (245 genes, 97 families)
- Actinista (Coelacanths)
  - Coelacanth (Latimeria chalumnae) (232 genes, 91 families)
- Teleostei (Teleost fish)
  - Pufferfish (Tetraodon nigroviridis) (287 genes, 97 families)
  - Cod (Gadus morhua) (338 genes, 120 families)
  - Asian swamp eel (Monopterus albus) (343 genes, 108 families)
  - Zebrafish (Danio rerio) (414 genes, 113 families)
- Holostei (Gars and Bowfins)
  - Spotted gar (Lepisosteus oculatus) (273 genes, 104 families)
- Chondrichthyes (Cartilaginous fish)
  - Cloudy Catshark (Scyliorhinus torazame) (248 genes, 91 families)
  - Australian ghostshark (Callorhinchus milii) (271 genes, 110 families)
- Cyclostomata
  - Inshore hagfish (Eptatretus burgeri) (180 genes, 77 families)
  - Sea Lamprey (Petromyzon marinus) (216 genes, 83 families)
- Urochordata (Sea squirts)
  - Sea Squirt (Ciona intestinalis) (107 genes, 72 families)
- Cephalochordata (Amphioxus)
  - Florida lancelet (Branchiostoma floridae) (130 genes, 73 families)
  - European lancelet (Branchiostoma lanceolatum) (202 genes, 77 families)
- Hemichordata
  - Saccoglossus (Saccoglossus kowalevskii) (78 genes, 50 families)
  - Ptychodera (Ptychodera flava) (87 genes, 53 families)
- Echinodermata
  - Purple sea urchin (Strongylocentrotus purpuratus) (60 genes, 44 families)
  - Bat starfish (Patiria miniata) (59 genes, 40 families)
- Xenoturbella
  - Xenoturbella (Xenoturbella bocki) (46 genes, 31 families)
- Hexapoda (Insects)
  - Fruit fly (Drosophila melanogaster) (161 genes, 99 families)
  - Fruit fly (Drosophila simulans) (159 genes, 97 families)
  - Fruit fly (Drosophila yakuba) (148 genes, 88 families)
  - Fruit fly (Drosophila ananassae) (159 genes, 101 families)
  - Fruit fly (Drosophila mojavensis) (162 genes, 102 families)
  - Yellow fever mosquito (Aedes aegypti) (118 genes, 70 families)
  - Longwing butterfly (Heliconius melpomene) (130 genes, 79 families)
  - Red flour beetle (Tribolium castaneum) (191 genes, 88 families)
  - Cockroach (Blattella germanica) (144 genes, 86 families)
- Crustacea
  - Common water flea (Daphnia pulex) (83 genes, 59 families)
  - Large common water flea (Daphnia magna) (80 genes, 56 families)
- Chelicerata
  - Deer tick (Ixodes scapularis) (64 genes, 52 families)
  - Arizona bark scorpion (Centruroides sculpturatus) (101 genes, 44 families)
  - Atlantic horseshoe crab (Limulus polyphemus) (293 genes, 55 families)
- Nematoda
  - Roundworm (Caenorhabditis elegans) (145 genes, 90 families)
  - Roundworm (Caenorhabditis briggsae) (186 genes, 89 families)
  - Large roundworm (Ascaris suum) (96 genes, 53 families)
- Annelida
  - Polychaete worm (Capitella teleta) (102 genes, 69 families)
  - Common brandling worm (Eisenia fetida) (193 genes, 66 families)
- Mollusca
  - Owl limpet (Lottia gigantea) (82 genes, 54 families)
  - Pacific oyster (Crassostrea gigas) (137 genes, 60 families)
  - Chambered Nautilus (Nautilus pompilius) (78 genes, 60 families)
  - Hawaiian bobtail squid (Euprymna scolopes) (147 genes, 113 families)
  - California two-spot octopus (Octopus bimaculoides) (173 genes, 136 families)
  - Common octopus (Octopus vulgaris) (177 genes, 135 families)
- Brachiopoda
  - Lingula (Lingula anatina) (106 genes, 51 families)
- Plathyhelminthes
  - Freshwater planarian (Schmidtea mediterranea) (107 genes, 45 families)
- Rotifera
  - Rotifer (Brachionus plicatilis) (47 genes, 35 families)
- Cnidaria
  - Starlet sea anemone (Nematostella vectensis) (30 genes, 24 families)
  - Freshwater-polyp (Hydra vulgaris) (26 genes, 23 families)
- Porifera
  - Amphimedon (Amphimedon queenslandica) (8 genes, 7 families)
  - Muellers freshwater sponge (Ephydatia muelleri) (7 genes, 5 families)
