= IsomiR =

MiRNA with variations

Variations from the reference sequence found in isomiRs

isomiRs (from iso- + miR) are miRNA sequences that have variations with respect to the reference sequence. The term was coined by Morin et al in 2008. It has been found that isomiR expression profiles can also exhibit race, population, and sex dependencies.

There are four main variation types:

- 5' trimming—the 5' dicing site is upstream or downstream from the reference miRNA sequence
- 3' trimming—the 3' dicing site is upstream or downstream from the reference miRNA sequence
- 3' nucleotide addition—nucleotides added to the 3' end of the reference miRNA
- nucleotide substitution—nucleotides changes from the miRNA precursor. It is thought that may be similar process than post-transcriptional modifications.

== Discovery ==
miRBase is considered to be the gold-standard miRNA database—it stores miRNA sequences detected by thousand of experiments. In this database each miRNA is associated with a miRNA precursor and with one or two mature miRNA (-5p and -3p). In the past it had always been said that the same miRNA precursor generates the same miRNA sequences. However, the advent of deep sequencing has now allowed researchers to detect a huge variability in miRNA biogenesis, meaning that from the same miRNA precursor many different sequences can be generated potentially have different targets, or even lead to opposite changes in mRNA expression.

== Biogenesis ==
The advent of sequencing has permitted scientists to elucidate a huge landscape of new miRNAs, to increase our knowledge of the biogenesis involved and to discover putative post-transcriptional editing processes in miRNAs ignored until now. These processes mostly generate variations of the current miRNAs that are annotated in miRBase in the 3' and 5' terminus and in minor frequencies, nucleotide substitution along the miRNA length. The variations are mainly generated by a shift of Drosha and Dicer in the cleavage site, but also by nucleotide additions at the 3'-end, resulting in new sequences different from the annotated miRNA. These were named "isomiRs" by Morin et al., 2008. IsomiRs have been well established along different species in metazoa and deeply described for the first time in human stem cells and human brain samples. Moreover, it has been proven that isomiRs are not caused by RNA degradation during sample preparation for next generation sequencing. Some studies have tried to explain the miRNA diversity by structural bases of precursors but without clear results. The functionality of adenylation or uridynilation at the 3'end (3'addition isomiRs) has been related to alterations in the miRNA-3'-UTR stability. Furthermore, differential expression of isomiRs has been detected during development in D. melanogaster and Hippoglossus hippoglossus L., suggesting a biological function.

- Trimming variants: these are possible due to slight variations by Drosha and/or Dicer
- Nucleotide addition: Wyman et al. have described the process of nucleotide transferases adding individual nucleotides to miRNA sequences
- Nucleotide substitution: there is a huge range of possible changes in such an event, some of them can be explained by current adenosine_deaminase like A to G or C to U, in a similar way to what happens in post-transcriptional RNA editing events involving mRNA.
