= Mammalian-wide interspersed repeat =

Transposable elements in the genomes of some organisms

Mammalian-wide interspersed repeats (MIRs) are transposable elements in the genomes of some organisms and belong to the group of short interspersed nuclear elements (SINEs).

== Incidence ==
MIRs are found in all mammals (including marsupials).

=== In human ===
It is estimated that there are around 368,000 MIRs in the human genome.

== Structure ==
The MIR consensus sequence is 260 basepairs long and has an A/T-rich 3' end.

== Propagation ==
Like other short interspersed nuclear elements, MIR elements used the machinery of long interspersed nuclear elements (LINE) for their propagation in the genome, which took place around 130 million years ago. Since the loss of activity of the required reverse transcriptase they can no longer retrotranspose.

== History of discovery ==
MIR elements have been first described in human genome 1989-1991 and were first referred as MB1 family repeats (mirror to sequences of mouse B1 repeat). Then this family repeats were found in other mammalian genomes. Then this family was renamed as "mammalian interspersed repeats" in 1992 Later this family was shown to be common for vertebrate genomes.
