= TSPAN8 =

Protein-coding gene in humans

Identifiers
- Aliases: TSPAN8, CO-029, TM4SF3, tetraspanin 8
- External IDs: OMIM: 600769; MGI: 2384918; GeneCards: TSPAN8

Gene location (Human)
Chr.	Chromosome 12 (human)
Band	12q21.1	Start	71,125,085 bp
Band	12q21.1	End	71,441,898 bp

Gene location (Mouse)
Chr.	Chromosome 10 (mouse)
Band	10|10 D2	Start	115,652,737 bp
Band	10|10 D2	End	115,685,798 bp
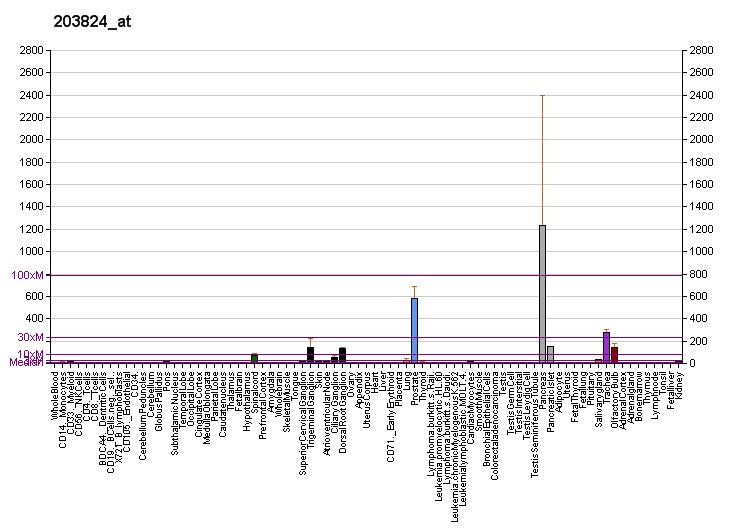
RNA expression pattern
Bgee	Human / Mouse (ortholog); Top expressed in: mucosa of colon; mucosa of sigmoid colon; jejunal mucosa; mucosa of transverse colon; mucosa of ileum; rectum; duodenum; pancreatic ductal cell; bronchial epithelial cell; gallbladder / Top expressed in: seminal vesicula; mucous cell of stomach; epithelium of stomach; left colon; pyloric antrum; crypt of lieberkuhn of small intestine; Paneth cell; migratory enteric neural crest cell; right lung lobe; ileum; More reference expression data
BioGPS	More reference expression data
Gene ontology
Molecular function	integrin binding; protein binding
Cellular component	integral component of membrane; integral component of plasma membrane; extracellular exosome; membrane; cell surface
Biological process	cell surface receptor signaling pathway; negative regulation of blood coagulation; spermatogenesis; regulation of gene expression
Sources:Amigo / QuickGO
Orthologs
Databases	NCBI: entry; OMA: entry
Species	Human	Mouse
Entrez	7103	216350
Ensembl	ENSG00000127324	ENSMUSG00000034127
UniProt	P19075	Q8R3G9
RefSeq (mRNA)	NM_004616; NM_001369760	NM_001168679; NM_001168680; NM_146010
RefSeq (protein)	NP_004607; NP_001356689	NP_001162150; NP_001162151; NP_666122
Location (UCSC)	Chr 12: 71.13 – 71.44 Mb	Chr 10: 115.65 – 115.69 Mb
PubMed search
- Wikidata
View/Edit Human	View/Edit Mouse

Tetraspanin-8 is a protein that in humans is encoded by the TSPAN8 gene.

== Function ==
The protein encoded by this gene is a member of the transmembrane 4 superfamily, also known as the tetraspanin family. Most of these members are cell-surface proteins that are characterized by the presence of four hydrophobic domains. The proteins mediate signal transduction events that play a role in the regulation of cell development, activation, growth and motility. This encoded protein is a cell surface glycoprotein that is known to complex with integrins. This gene is expressed in different carcinomas. The use of alternate polyadenylation sites has been found for this gene.

== Clinical significance ==
Overall survival of ovarian cancer patients was effectively predicted by TSPAN8.
