= MTFR1L =

Protein-coding gene in humans

Identifiers
- Aliases: MTFR1L, FAM54B, MST116, MSTP116, HYST1888, mitochondrial fission regulator 1 like
- External IDs: MGI: 1924074; GeneCards: MTFR1L

Gene location (Human)
Chr.	Chromosome 1 (human)
Band	1p36.11	Start	25,818,640 bp
Band	1p36.11	End	25,832,942 bp

Gene location (Mouse)
Chr.	Chromosome 4 (mouse)
Band	4|4 D3	Start	134,252,861 bp
Band	4|4 D3	End	134,262,698 bp
RNA expression pattern
Bgee	Human / Mouse (ortholog); Top expressed in: right adrenal gland; right adrenal cortex; left adrenal gland; left adrenal cortex; apex of heart; left ventricle; right auricle of heart; muscle of thigh; left testis; gastrocnemius muscle / Top expressed in: muscle of thigh; sternocleidomastoid muscle; right kidney; temporal muscle; triceps brachii muscle; digastric muscle; seminiferous tubule; lens; ankle; left lobe of liver; More reference expression data
BioGPS	n/a
Gene ontology
Molecular function	protein binding
Cellular component	mitochondrion
Biological process	mitochondrial fission; aerobic dissimilation
Sources:Amigo / QuickGO
Orthologs
Databases	NCBI: entry; OMA: entry
Species	Human	Mouse
Entrez	56181	76824
Ensembl	ENSG00000117640	ENSMUSG00000046671
UniProt	Q9H019	Q9CWE0
RefSeq (mRNA)	NM_019557; NM_001099625; NM_001099626; NM_001099627	NM_001256112; NM_029759; NM_001355187; NM_001355188
RefSeq (protein)	NP_001093095; NP_001093096; NP_001093097; NP_062457	NP_001243041; NP_084035; NP_001342116; NP_001342117
Location (UCSC)	Chr 1: 25.82 – 25.83 Mb	Chr 4: 134.25 – 134.26 Mb
PubMed search
- Wikidata
View/Edit Human	View/Edit Mouse

Mitochondrial fission regulator 1 like is a protein that in humans is encoded by the MTFR1L gene.
