= Mir-221 microRNA =

MicroRNA

mir-221
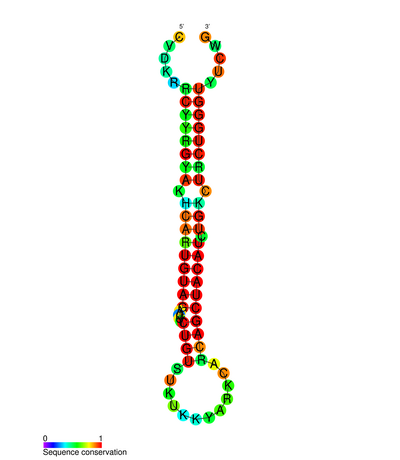
- Conserved secondary structure of mir-221

Identifiers
- Symbol: mir-221
- Rfam: RF00651
- miRBase family: MIPF0000051
- HGNC: 31601
- OMIM: 300568

Other data
- RNA type: microRNA
- Domain(s): Eukaryota; Vertebrata;
- PDB structures: PDBe

In molecular biology, mir-221 microRNA (and its paralogue, mir-222) is a short RNA molecule. MicroRNAs function to regulate the expression levels of other genes by several mechanisms.

mir-221 is an oncogenic microRNA. It targets CD117, which then prevents cell migration and proliferation in endothelial cells. miR-221 is known as an anti angiogenic miRNA. Recent important studies have reported that miR-221 is also involved in induction of angiogenesis. RNA induced Silencing Complex (RISC) proteins SND1 and AEG-1 induces miR-221 expression in Liver cancer. In liver cancer miR-221 induces the tumor angiogenesis. miR-221 detection in human faeces can be a non-invasive screening marker for colorectal cancer.

miR-221 has been identified as playing a role in androgenetic alopecia.

== See also ==
- MicroRNA
