= Interleukin 32 =

Protein found in humans

IL32

Identifiers
- Aliases: IL32, IL-32alpha, IL-32beta, IL-32delta, IL-32gamma, NK4, TAIF, TAIFa, TAIFb, TAIFc, TAIFd, Interleukin 32, IL-32
- External IDs: OMIM: 606001; HomoloGene: 128400; GeneCards: IL32; OMA:IL32 - orthologs

Gene location (Human)
Chr.	Chromosome 16 (human)
Band	16p13.3	Start	3,065,297 bp
Band	16p13.3	End	3,082,192 bp
RNA expression pattern
Bgee	Human / Mouse (ortholog); Top expressed in: granulocyte; mucosa of transverse colon; body of pancreas; spleen; apex of heart; duodenum; jejunal mucosa; islet of Langerhans; muscle of thigh; mucosa of ileum / n/a; More reference expression data
BioGPS	n/a
Gene ontology
Molecular function	cytokine activity; protein binding
Cellular component	extracellular region; membrane; cytosol; extracellular space
Biological process	defense response; cell adhesion; immune response; regulation of signaling receptor activity; cytokine-mediated signaling pathway
Sources:Amigo / QuickGO
Orthologs
Species	Human	Mouse
Entrez	9235	n/a
Ensembl	ENSG00000008517	n/a
UniProt	P24001	n/a
RefSeq (mRNA)	NM_001012631; NM_001012632; NM_001012633; NM_001012634; NM_001012635 NM_001012636; NM_001012718; NM_001308078; NM_004221	n/a
RefSeq (protein)	NP_001012649; NP_001012650; NP_001012651; NP_001012652; NP_001012653 NP_001012654; NP_001012736; NP_001295007; NP_004212; NP_001356516; NP_001356517; NP_001356518; NP_001356519; NP_001356520; NP_001356521; NP_001356522; NP_001356524; NP_001356525; NP_001363852	n/a
Location (UCSC)	Chr 16: 3.07 – 3.08 Mb	n/a
PubMed search		n/a
- Wikidata
View/Edit Human

Interleukin 32 (IL32) is proinflammatory cytokine that in humans is encoded by the IL32 gene. Interleukin 32 can be found in higher mammals but not in rodents. It is mainly expressed intracellularly and the protein has nine different isoforms, because the pre-mRNA can be alternatively spliced. The most active and studied isoform is IL-32γ. It was first reported in 2005, although the IL-32 gene was first described in 1992. It does not belong to any cytokine family because there is almost no homology with other cytokines.

mRNA of IL-32 is mostly expressed in immune cells but also can be expressed in other tissues such as spleen, thymus, lung, small intestine, colon, prostate, heart, placenta, liver, muscle, kidney, pancreas and brain.

Interleukin 32 is connected with several diseases, including cancer.

== Function ==
This gene encodes a member of the cytokine family. The protein contains a tyrosine sulfation site, 3 potential N-myristoylation sites, multiple putative phosphorylation sites, and an RGD cell-attachment sequence. Expression of this protein is increased after the activation of T-cells by mitogens or the activation of NK cells by IL-2. This protein induces the production of TNF-alpha from macrophage cells. Alternate transcriptional splice variants, encoding different isoforms, have been characterized.

Interleukin 32 (IL-32) is a pro-inflammatory cytokine that can induce cells of the immune system (such as monocytes and macrophages) to secrete inflammatory cytokines, such as tumor necrosis factor-alpha (TNF-α) and IL-6. In addition, it can also induce the production of chemokines such as IL-8 and MIP-2 / CXCL2.

IL-32 can also support osteoclast differentiation but not osteoclast activation by regulating the MAPK/ERK pathway and the actin cytoskeleton.

== Cancer ==
Cancer is often connected with chronic infection and inflammation – they are cause of cancer in 25% of cases. IL-32 plays role in chronic inflammation process and in cancers connected with chronic inflammation (lung cancer, pancreatic cancer, cervical cancer and colon cancer).

IL-32 can be mainly found in cytoplasm of cancer cells. In various cancer tissues, IL32 is highly expressed and presently, the most common isoform of IL-32 found in cancer cells is IL-32β.

Function of IL-32 can be very different, depending on its isoform (different isoforms can interact with each other and influence their activities) and type of cell, where it is expressed.

IL-32 supports the tumor progression by cytokines expressed after activation of transcription factor NF-κB (nuclear factor-kB) and by metalloproteinase production. In addition, IL-32 stimulates differentiation into immunosuppressive cell types in some cancer types. These effects of IL-32 support tumor growth. On the other hand, in other cancer types it can also induce tumor cell apoptosis and enhance NK a cytotoxic T cell sensitivity which suppress tumor growth.
