= MiR-155 =

Non-coding RNA in the species Homo sapiens

pre-mir-155
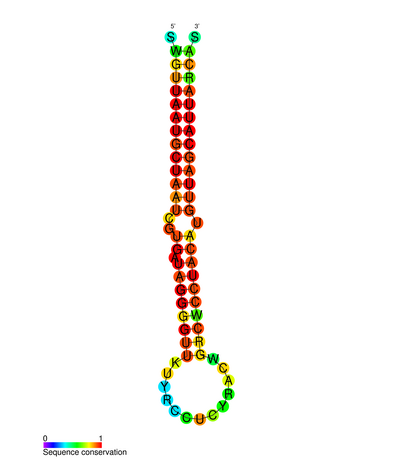
- pre-mir-155 secondary structure and sequence conservation.ard

Identifiers
- Symbol: miR-155
- Rfam: RF00731
- miRBase family: MIPF0000157

Other data
- RNA type: microRNA
- Domain: Eukaryota;
- PDB structures: PDBe

MIR155

Identifiers
- Aliases: MIR155, MIRN155, miRNA155, mir-155, miR-155, microRNA 155
- External IDs: OMIM: 609337; GeneCards: MIR155; OMA:MIR155 - orthologs

Gene location (Human)
Chr.	Chromosome 21 (human)
Band	21q21.3	Start	25,573,980 bp
Band	21q21.3	End	25,574,044 bp
RNA expression pattern
Bgee	Human / Mouse (ortholog); Top expressed in: salivary gland; blood; hippocampus proper; mucosa of esophagus; anterior cingulate cortex; right auricle of heart; glomerulus; male reproductive system; prostate; thyroid gland / n/a; More reference expression data
BioGPS	n/a
Orthologs
Species	Human	Mouse
Entrez	406947	n/a
Ensembl	ENSG00000283904	n/a
UniProt	n a	n/a
RefSeq (mRNA)	n/a	n/a
RefSeq (protein)	n/a	n/a
Location (UCSC)	Chr 21: 25.57 – 25.57 Mb	n/a
PubMed search		n/a
- Wikidata
View/Edit Human

MiR-155 is a microRNA that in humans is encoded by the MIR155 host gene or MIR155HG. MiR-155 plays a role in various physiological and pathological processes. Exogenous molecular control in vivo of miR-155 expression may inhibit malignant growth, viral infections, and enhance the progression of cardiovascular diseases.

== Discovery ==
The MIR155HG was initially identified as a gene that was transcriptionally activated by promoter insertion at a common retroviral integration site in B-cell lymphomas and was formerly called BIC (B-cell Integration Cluster). The MIR155HG is transcribed by RNA polymerase II and the resulting ~1,500 nucleotide RNA is capped and polyadenylated. The 23 nucleotide single-stranded miR-155, which is harbored in exon 3, is subsequently processed from the parent RNA molecule.

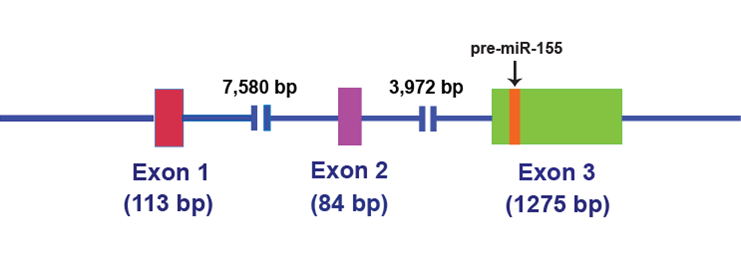
Figure 1. Schematic representation of the MIR155HG (accession # NC_000021). This gene spans 13024 bp, is composed of three exons, and encodes a 1500 bp non-coding primary-miRNA (pri-miRNA) (accession # NR_001458). The location of the pre-mir-155 is denoted by the orange box.

== Biogenesis ==
The MIR155HG RNA transcript does not contain a long open reading frame (ORF), however, it does include an imperfectly base-paired stem loop that is conserved across species. This non-coding RNA (ncRNA) is now defined as a primary-miRNA (pri-miRNA). Once miR-155 pri-miRNA is transcribed, this transcript is cleaved by the nuclear microprocessor complex, of which the core components are the RNase III type endonuclease Drosha and the DiGeorge critical region 8 (DGCR8) protein, to produce a 65 nucleotide stem-loop precursor miRNA (pre-mir-155) (see Figure 2).

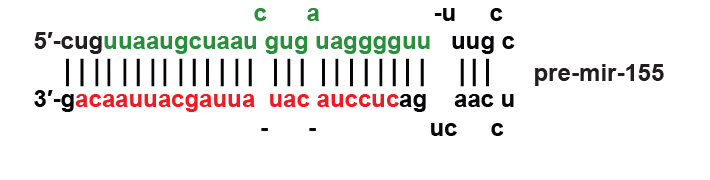
Figure 2. The sequence of the pre-mir-155 stem loop that is matured from the pri-miRNA transcript. The mature miR-155 (miR-155-5p) sequence is shown in green and mature miR-155* (miR-155-3p) sequence is shown in red.

Following export from the nucleus by exportin-5, pre-mir-155 molecules are cleaved near the terminal loop by Dicer resulting in RNA duplexes of ~22nucleotides. Following Dicer cleavage, an Argonaute (Ago) protein binds to the short RNA duplexes, forming the core of a multi-subunit complex called the RNA-induced silencing complex (RISC). In a manner similar to siRNA duplexes, one of the two strands, the "passenger miRNA" (miR-155*), is released and degraded while the other strand, designated the "guide strand" or "mature miRNA" (miR-155), is retained within the RISC.

Recent data suggest that both arms of the pre-miRNA hairpin can give rise to mature miRNAs. Due to the increasing number of examples where two functional mature miRNAs are processed from opposite arms of the same pre-miRNA, pre-mir-155 products are now denoted with the suffix -5p (from the 5′ arm) (e.g. miR-155-5p) and -3p (from the 3′ arm) (e.g. miR-155-3p) following their name (see Figure 3).

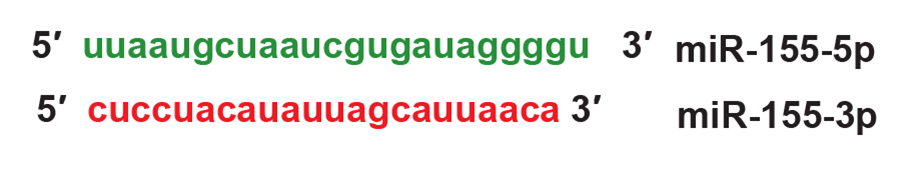
Figure 3. The mature miR-155 (miR-155-5p) sequence is shown in green and mature miR-155* (miR-155-3p) sequence is shown in red.

Once miR-155-5p/-3p is assembled into the RISC, these molecules subsequently recognize their target messenger RNA (mRNA) by base pairing interactions between nucleotides 2 and 8 of miR-155-5p/-3p (the seed region) and complementary nucleotides predominantly in the 3′-untranslated region (3′-UTR) of mRNAs (see Figure 4 and 5 below). Finally, with the miR-155-5p/-3p acting as an adaptor for the RISC, complex-bound mRNAs are subjected to translational repression (i.e. inhibition of translation initiation) and/or degradation following deadenylation.

== Evolutionary conservation ==
Early phylogenetic analyses demonstrated that the sequence of pre-mir-155 and miR-155-5p was conserved between human, mouse, and chicken. Recent annotated sequencing data found that 22 different organisms including, mammals, amphibians, birds, reptiles, sea squirts, and sea lampreys, express a conserved miR-155-5p. Currently much less sequence data is available regarding miR-155-3p, therefore, it is not clear how conserved this miRNA is across species.

== Tissue distribution ==
Northern blot analysis found that miR-155 pri-miRNA was abundantly expressed in the human spleen and thymus and detectable in the liver, lung, and kidney. Sequence analysis of small RNA clone libraries comparing miRNA expression to all other organ systems examined established that miR-155-5p was one of five miRNAs (i.e. miR-142, miR-144, miR-150, miR-155, and miR-223) that was specific for hematopoietic cells including B-cells, T-cells, monocytes and granulocytes. Together these results suggest that miR-155-5p is expressed in a number of tissues and cell types and, therefore, may play a critical role in a wide variety of biological processes, including hematopoiesis

Although very few studies have investigated the expression levels of miR-155-3p, Landgraf et al. established that expression levels of this miRNA was very low in hematopoietic cells. Additionally, PCR analyses found that while miR-155-3p was detectable in a number of human tissues the expression levels of this miRNA were 20–200 fold less when compared to miR-155-5p levels. Even though the function of miR-155-3p has been largely ignored, several studies now suggest that, in some cases (astrocytes and plasmacytoid dendritic cells), both miR-155-5p and -3p can be functionally matured from pre-mir-155.

== Targets ==
Bioinformatic analysis using TargetScan 6.2 (release date June, 2012) revealed at least 4,174 putative human miR-155-5p mRNA targets exist, with a total of 918 conserved sites (i.e. between mouse and human) and 4,249 poorly conserved sites (i.e. human only). Although the TargetScan 6.2 algorithm cannot be utilized to determine the miR-155-3p putative targets, one would speculate that this miRNA may also potentially regulate the expression of thousands of mRNA targets.

A comprehensive list of miR-155-5p/mRNA targets that were experimentally authenticated by both the demonstration of endogenous transcript regulation by miR-155-5p and validation of the miR-155-5p seed sequence through a reporter assay was recently assembled. This list included 140 genes and included regulatory proteins for myelopoiesis and leukemogenesis (e.g. SHIP-1, AICDA, ETS1, JARID2, SPI1, etc.), inflammation (e.g. BACH1, FADD, IKBKE, INPP5D, MYD88, RIPK1, SPI1, SOCS, etc.) and known tumor suppressors (e.g. CEBPβ, IL17RB, PCCD4, TCF12, ZNF652, etc.). The validated miR-155-5p binding site harbored in the SPI1 mRNA and the validated miR-155-3p binding site harbored in the IRAK3 mRNA are shown in Figures 4 and 5 respectively.

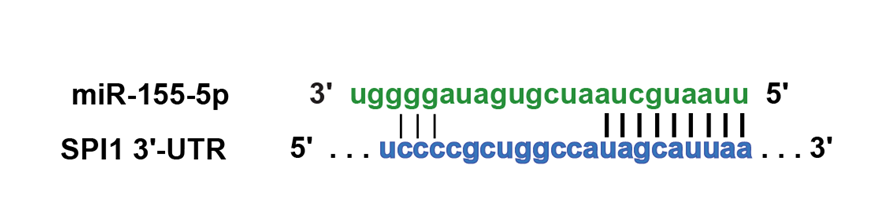
Figure 4. Complementary base-pairing between miR-155-5p and the human SPI1 (spleen focus forming virus proviral integration oncogene)(also known as PU.1) mRNA. The miR-155-5p binding site is located 46–53 base pairs downstream from the SPI1 mRNA stop codon. The requisite "seed sequence" base-pairing is denoted by the bold dashes.

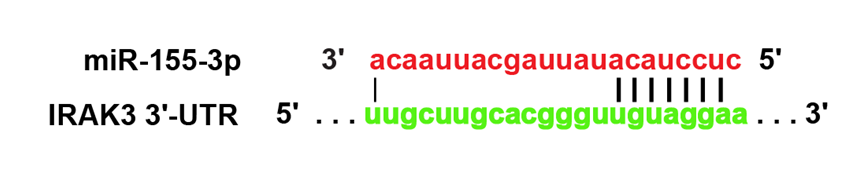
Figure 5. Complementary base-pairing between miR-155-3p and the human IRAK3 (interleukin-1 receptor-associated kinase 3) mRNA. The miR-155-3p binding site is located 424–430 base pairs downstream from the IRAK3 mRNA stop codon. The requisite "seed sequence" base-pairing is denoted by the bold dashes.

== Physiological roles ==
=== Hematopoiesis ===
Hematopoiesis is defined as the formation and development of blood cells, all of which are derived from hematopoietic stem-progenitor cells (HSPCs). HSPCs are primitive cells capable of self-renewal and initially differentiate into common myeloid progenitor (CMP) or common lymphoid progenitor (CLP) cells. CMPs represent the cellular population that has become myeloid lineage and it is the point that myelopoiesis begins. During myelopoiesis further cellular differentiation takes place including thrombopoiesis, erythropoiesis, granulopoiesis, and monocytopoiesis. CLPs subsequently differentiate into B-cells and T-cells in a process designated lymphopoiesis. Given that miR-155-5p is expressed in hematopoietic cells it was hypothesized that this miRNA plays a critical role in these cellular differentiation processes. In support of this premise, miR-155-5p was found to be expressed in CD34(+) human HSPCs, and it was speculated that this miRNA may hold these cells at an early stem-progenitor stage, inhibiting their differentiation into a more mature cell (i.e. megakaryocytic/erythroid/granulocytic/monocytic/B-lymphoid/T-lymphoid). This hypothesis was substantiated when pre-mir-155 transduced HSPCs generated 5-fold fewer myeloid and 3-fold fewer erythroid colonies. Additionally, Hu et al. demonstrated that the homeobox protein, HOXA9, regulated MIR155HG expression in myeloid cells and that this miRNA played a functional role in hematopoiesis. These investigators found that forced expression of miR-155-5p in bone marrow cells resulted in a ~50% decrease in SPI1 (i.e. PU.1), a transcription factor and a regulator of myelopoiesis, and a validated target of this miRNA. It was also established that in vitro differentiation of purified human erythroid progenitor cells resulted in a progressive decrease of miR-155-5p expression in mature red cells. Additionally, mice deficient in pre-mir-155 showed clear defects in lymphocyte development and generation of B- and T-cell responses in vivo. Finally, it was established that regulatory T-cell (Tregs) development required miR-155-5p and this miRNA was shown to play a role in Treg homeostasis and overall survival by directly targeting SOCS1, a negative regulator for IL-2 signaling. Taken together, these results strongly suggest that miR-155-5p is an essential molecule in the control of several aspects of hematopoiesis including myelopoiesis, erythropoiesis, and lymphopoiesis.

=== Immune system ===
The innate immune system constitutes the first line of defense against invading pathogens and is regarded as the major initiator of inflammatory responses. Its cellular component involves primarily monocyte/macrophages, granulocytes, and dendritic cells (DCs), which are activated upon sensing of conserved pathogen structures (PAMPs) by pattern recognition receptors such as Toll-like receptors ((TLRs)). MIR155HG (i.e. miR-155-5p) expression is greatly enhanced by TLR agonist stimulation of macrophages and dendritic cells. Since microbial lipopolysaccharide (an agonist of TLR4) activates a chain of events that lead to the stimulation of the NF-κB and AP-1 transcription factors, it was hypothesized that endotoxin activation of MIR155HG may be mediated by those transcription factors. Indeed, MIR155HG expression was found to be activated in LPS treated murine macrophage cells (i.e. Raw264.7) by an NF-κB-mediated mechanism. Furthermore, H. pylori infection of primary murine bone marrow-derived macrophages resulted in a NF-κB dependent up-regulation of MIR155HG. In the context of viral infection vesicular stomatitis virus (VSV) challenge of murine peritoneal macrophages was reported to result in miR-155-5p over-expression via a retinoic acid-inducible gene I/JNK/NF-κB–dependent pathway. Support for a role of AP-1 in MIR155HG activation comes from studies using stimuli relevant to viral infection such as TLR3 ligand poly(I:C) or interferon beta (IFN-β). Downstream of those stimuli AP-1 seems to play a major role in MIR155HG activation.

Upon its initiation via activation of e.g. TLRs by pathogen stimuli miR-155-5p functions as a post-transcriptional regulator of innate immune signaling pathways. Importantly, miR-155-5p displays a similar responsiveness to pathogen stimuli (e.g. TLR4 agonist LPS) as major pro-inflammatory marker mRNAs. Once activated, miR-155-5p suppresses negative regulators of inflammation. These include inositol polyphosphate-5-phosphatase (INPP5D also denoted SHIP1) and suppressor of cytokine signaling 1 (SOCS1), suppression of which promotes cell survival, growth, migration, and anti-pathogen responses. Besides supporting the activation of defense pathways miR-155-5p may also limit the strength of the resulting NF-κB dependent inflammatory response, suggesting varying functions of miR-155 at different stages of inflammation.

Taken together, these observations imply that the activation of the MIR155HG may be context-dependent given that both AP-1- and NF-κB-mediated mechanisms regulate the expression of this gene. These studies also suggest that a broad range of viral and bacterial inflammatory mediators can stimulate the expression of miR-155-5p and indicate that there is an intimate relationship between inflammation, innate immunity and MIR155HG expression.

== Activity and phenotypes ==
There is evidence that miR-155 participates in cascades associated with cardiovascular diseases and hypertension, and was also found to be implicated in immunity, genomic instability, cell differentiation, inflammation, virus associated infections, cancer, and diabetes mellitus.

Protective roles of miR-155 may arise in response to its action on silencing genes thereby regulating their expression time, mutations in miR-155 target site deny it the optimal access necessary to bring about gene silencing, leading to over abundance of delinquent activities that may go malignant, for example, miR-155 role as a protective agent against predisposition to B Cell associated malignancies is emphasized by maintaining the balance of Activation-Induced Cytidine Deaminase (AID) enzyme. MiR-155 mediates regulation of AID abundance and expression time upon immunological cues however, mutations in the target on AID mRNA result in its unresponsiveness to miR-155 silencing and lead to unbridled expression of its protein causing wild immature B-lymphocyte surges and AID-mediated chromosomal translocations.

== Clinical significance ==
=== Cardiovascular ===
Transfection of miR-155 into human primary lung fibroblasts reduces the endogenous expression of the angiotensin II receptor AT1R protein. Furthermore, AT1R mediates angiotensin II-related elevation in blood pressure and contributes to the pathogenesis of heart failure. Defective miR-155 function could be implicated in hypertension and cardiovascular diseases if the cis-regulatory site on 3` UTR of AT1R (miR-155 target site) was affected due to a SNP polymorphism in AT1R itself. This mutation is disruptive of miR-155 targeting and thus preventive of AT1R expression down-regulation. In low blood pressure over-expression of miR-155 correlates with the impairment of AT1R activity.

=== Immunity ===
miR-155 is involved in immunity by playing key roles in modulating humoral and innate cell-mediated immune responses, for example, In miR-155 deficient mice, immunological-memory is impaired; making it fall prey to repetitive bouts of invasions by the same pathogen (Rodriguez et al. 2007), maturation and specificity of miR-155-deficient B-lymphocytes are impaired since the process relies on AID enzyme which has a miR-155 target in its 3′ UTR end. The phenotypic consequences involving deficiency of miR-155 in mice show later in life where the animals develop lung and intestinal lesions.

Activated B and T cells show increased miR-155 expression, the same goes for macrophages and dendritic cells of the immune system. MiR-155 is crucial for proper lymphocyte development and maturation. Details of various manifestations of miR-155 levels and involvement in activities that ascertain optimal immune responses have been the subject of many researches:

==== Reduction of IgG1 ====
Defective T and B cells as well as markedly decreased IgG1 responses were observed in miR-155-deficient mice, IgG1 is reduced whereas the expression of the IgM immunoglobulin remains normal in these mice. The change in IgG1 levels maybe explained by the fact that it is a target for miR-155 in B cells, the protein-encoding mRNA for the transcriptional regulator Pu.1-protein, elevation of Pu.1 protein predisposes defective IgG1 production. In addition to Pu.1, there are nearly 60 other differentially elevated genes in miR-155 deficient B cells, further inspection revealed possible miR-155 target sites in the 3′ UTR regions in these genes.

==== Lymphocyte malignancies ====
Mature receptors affinity and specificity of lymphocytes to pathogenic agents underlie proper immune responses, optimal miR-155 coordination is required for manufacturing of normal B lymphocytes, production of high-affinity antibodies and balancing of BCR signalling. It has been demonstrated that miR-155 can be transferred through gap junctions from leukemic cells to healthy B cells and promote their transformation to tumorigenic-like cells.

Selection of competent B cells takes place in the germinal center where they are trained to differentiate body cells vs. foreign antigens, they compete for antigen recognition and for T cell help, in this fashion of selective pressure those B Cells that demonstrated high-affinity receptors and cooperation with T cells (affinity maturation) are recruited and deployed to the bone marrow or become memory B cells, apoptotic termination takes place for those B Cells failing the competition. Immature B cells which are miR-155 deficient evade apoptosis as a result of elevated Bcl-2 protein levels; a protein that was found to be involved in B Cell malignancies and to be controlled by miR-155.

=== Inflammation ===
Inflammatory responses to triggers such as TNF-α involve macrophages with components that include miR-155. miR-155 is overexpressed in atopic dermatitis and contributes to chronic skin inflammation by increasing the proliferative response of T(H) cells through the downregulation of CTLA-4. In Autoimmune disorders such as rheumatoid arthritis, miR-155 showed higher expression in patients' tissues and synovial fibroblasts. In multiple sclerosis, increased expression of mir-155 has also been measured in peripheral and CNS-resident myeloid cells, including circulating blood monocytes and activated microglia. It was also found that mir-155 is implicated in inflammation. Overexpression of mir-155 will lead to chronic inflammatory state in human.

=== DNA viruses ===
In DNA viruses, miRNAs were experimentally verified, miRNAs in viruses are encoded by dsDNAs, examples of such viruses include herpesviruses such as Humans-Epstein-Barr Virus (EBV) and adenoviruses, another virus expressing miR-155-like miRNA in chickens is the oncogenic MDV-1 whose non-oncogenic relative MDV-2 does not, this suggests implication of miR-155 in lymphomagenesis. Viruses can exploit host miRNAs to the degree that they use host miRNAs to encode for viral clones for example: miR-K12-11 in Kaposi's-sarcoma-associated Herpesvirus has a target specificity region orthologous to that of miR-155's; mimicking the action of miR-155 and, sharing targets with it, thus it can be thought to suppress miR-155 accessibility to its targets by competition and this in effect downregulates expression of genes playing roles in cellular growth and apoptosis in a manner that defies regulations by miR-155. EBV modulates host miR-155 expression, which is essential for growth of EBV-infected B cells. EBV-infected cells have increased expression of miR-155 thereby disturbing equilibrium of expression for genes regulating transcription in those cells.

=== Cancer ===
Over-silencing by miR-155 may result in triggering oncogenic cascades that begin by apoptotic resistance, the pro-apoptotic Tumour Protein-53-induced-nuclear-protein1 (TP53INP1) is silenced by miR-155, over-expression of miR-155 leads to decreased levels of TP53INP1 in pancreatic ductal adenocarcinomas and possibly in other epithelial cancers where TP53INP1 activity is lost thereby resulting in apoptosis evasion and uncontrolled bouts of growth.

Inactivation of DNA Mismatch Repair (MMR) as identified by elevation of mutation rates is the cause of Lynch Syndrome (LS), also known as hereditary nonpolyposis colorectal cancer (HNPCC), down-regulation of MMR controlling protein is carried out by over-expression of miR-155, MMR is controlled by a group of conserved proteins, reduced activity of these proteins results in elevated levels of mutations in the phenotype triggering a march towards developing this type of cancer.

Other types of tumors in which miR-155 over-expression was reported include: thyroid carcinoma, breast cancer, colon cancer, cervical cancer, and lung cancer, where distinct miR-155 expression profiles quantification can potentially serve as signals for tumor detection and evaluation of prognosis outcome. It is shown in an analysis that miR-155 expression is associated with survival in triple negative breast cancer.

== See also ==
- MicroRNA
