= PLEKHA7 =

Protein-coding gene in the species Homo sapiens

Identifiers
- Aliases: PLEKHA7, pleckstrin homology domain containing A7
- External IDs: OMIM: 612686; MGI: 2445094; GeneCards: PLEKHA7

Gene location (Human)
Chr.	Chromosome 11 (human)
Band	11p15.2-p15.1	Start	16,777,317 bp
Band	11p15.2-p15.1	End	17,014,443 bp

Gene location (Mouse)
Chr.	Chromosome 7 (mouse)
Band	7|7 F1	Start	115,722,720 bp
Band	7|7 F1	End	115,907,611 bp
RNA expression pattern
Bgee	Human / Mouse (ortholog); Top expressed in: sural nerve; pancreatic ductal cell; ventricular zone; apex of heart; myocardium of left ventricle; right auricle of heart; mucosa of ileum; minor salivary glands; mucosa of transverse colon; right uterine tube / Top expressed in: yolk sac; medullary collecting duct; atrium; otic vesicle; saccule; retinal pigment epithelium; ciliary body; decidua; crypt of lieberkuhn of small intestine; gastrula; More reference expression data
BioGPS	n/a
Gene ontology
Molecular function	delta-catenin binding; protein binding
Cellular component	zonula adherens; adherens junction; cell junction; centrosome; extracellular exosome; cytoskeleton; nucleus; microtubule organizing center; cytoplasm; cytosol; cell-cell junction
Biological process	epithelial cell-cell adhesion; zonula adherens maintenance; cell-cell adhesion mediated by cadherin
Sources:Amigo / QuickGO
Orthologs
Databases	NCBI: entry; OMA: entry
Species	Human	Mouse
Entrez	144100	233765
Ensembl	ENSG00000166689	ENSMUSG00000045659
UniProt	Q6IQ23	Q3UIL6
RefSeq (mRNA)	NM_001329630; NM_001329631; NM_175058	NM_172743; NM_001305185; NM_001305186; NM_001305189; NM_001305190
RefSeq (protein)	NP_001316559; NP_001316560; NP_778228	NP_001292114; NP_001292115; NP_001292118; NP_001292119; NP_766331 NP_001391998; NP_001391999; NP_001392000; NP_001392001
Location (UCSC)	Chr 11: 16.78 – 17.01 Mb	Chr 7: 115.72 – 115.91 Mb
PubMed search
- Wikidata
View/Edit Human	View/Edit Mouse

PLEKHA7 (Pleckstrin homology domain-containing family A member 7) is an adherens junction (AJ) protein, involved in the junction's integrity and stability.

== History ==
The protein was discovered in Masatoshi Takeichi's lab while looking for potential binding partners for the N-terminal region of p120. PLEKHA7 was identified by mass spectrometry in lysates of human intestinal carcinoma (Caco-2) cells in a GST-pull down using N-terminal GST-fusion p120 catenin as bait. It was also independently discovered in Sandra Citi's group as a protein interacting with globular head domain of the Paracingulin in a yeast two-hybrid screen. PLEKHA7 localizes at epithelial zonular AJs.

== Structure ==
The structure of PLEKHA7 is characterized by two WW domains followed by a Pleckstrin homology domain (PH) in the N-terminal region. In the C-terminal half, the protein contains three coiled coil (CC) domains and two Proline-rich (Pro) domains. PLEKHA7 has been detected in different isoforms in a tissue specific manner. Two isoforms of 135 kDa and 145 kDa have been reported in colon, liver, lung, eye, pancreas, kidney and heart. Additionally, two major transcripts of 5.5 kb and 6.5 kb have been identified in brain, kidney, liver, small intestine, placenta and lung, while only one PLEKHA7 mRNA transcript of 5.5 kb is identified in heart, brain, colon and skeletal muscle.

== Protein-protein interactions ==
In vitro interaction studies were pursued to map the interaction(s) of PLEKHA7 with p120 (residues 538-696), Nezha (CAMSAP3) (residues 680-821), paracingulin (residues 620-769) and Afadin (residues 120-374). The protein PDZD11 was identified as a protein interacting through its N-terminal region with the N-terminal WW domain of PLEKHA7, based on 2-hybrid screen and analysis of PLEKHA7 immunoprecipitates Unlike most other AJ proteins, but similar to afadin, PLEKHA7 is exclusively detected in the zonular apical part of AJ, but not in the "puncta adherentia" along lateral membranes of the epithelial cells. Cellular localization and tissue distribution of PLEKHA7 has been confirmed by Immunoelectron microscopy (Immuno-EM) of wild type and knock down intestinal epithelial tissues.

== Function ==
The first identified function of PLEKHA7 was to contribute to integrity and stability of the zonula adherens junctions by linking the E-cadherin/p120 complex to the minus ends of microtubules (MTs) through Nezha (CAMSAP3). The PLEKHA7-Nezha- MTs complex allows transport of the KIFC3 (a minus end directed motor) to the AJ. However, in Eph4 cell line, PLEKHA7 is recruited to E-cadherin based AJ by Afadin, independently of p120. PLEKHA7 knockdown studies in Madin-Darby canine kidney (MDCK) cells indicated its requirement for the AJ localization of paracingulin. Furthermore, the PLEKHA7 homolog in zebrafish, Hadp1, is required for proper heart function and morphogenesis in embryo, regulating the intracellular Ca^{2+} dynamics through the phosphatidylinositol 4-kinase (PIK4) pathway.

In 2015, researchers discovered that PLEKHA7 recruits the so-called microprocessor complex (association of Drosha and DGCR8 proteins) to a growth-inhibiting site (apical zonula adherens) in epithelial cells instead of sites at basolateral areas of cell–cell contact containing tyrosine-phosphorylated p120 and active Src. Loss of PLEKHA7 disrupts miRNAs regulation, causing tumorigenic signaling and growth. Restoring normal miRNA levels in tumor cells can reverse that aberrant signaling. In 2015 it was also discovered that PLEKHA7 has a role in controlling susceptibility to Staphylococcus aureus alpha-toxin Cells lacking PLEKHA7 are injured by the toxin, but recover after intoxication. Mice knockout for PLEKHA7 are viable and fertile, and when infected with methycillin-resistant S. aureus USA300 LAC strain they show a decreased disease severity in both skin infection and lethal pneumonia, thus identifying PLEKHA7 as a potential nonessential host target to reduce S. aureus virulence during epithelial infections.

In 2016, researchers found that PLEKHA7 recruits the small PDZ protein PDZD11 to adherens junctions, thus resulting in the stabilisation of nectins at adherens junctions. Knock-out of PLEKHA7 results in the loss of PDZD11 from epithelial adherens junctions, and this is rescued by the introduction of exogenous PLEKHA7. The N-terminal 44 residues of PDZD11 interact with the first WW domain of PLEKHA7. In the absence of either PLEKHA7 or PDZD11, the amount of nectin-3 and nectin-4 detected at junctions is decreased, as well as total nectin levels, through proteasome-mediated degradation. PDZD11 interacts directly with the cytoplasmic PDZ-binding motif of nectins, through its own PDZ domain. Proximity ligation assay shows that PLEKHA7 is associated to nectins in a PDZD11-dependent manner. Nectins are the second major class of transmembrane adhesion molecules at adherens junctions, besides cadherins. Therefore, PLEKHA7 stabilises both cadherins and nectins at AJ.

== Clinical significance ==
Genome-wide association studies suggest that PLEKHA7 is associated with blood pressure and hypertension and primary angle closure glaucoma. Also, an increased expression of PLEKHA7 in invasive lobular breast cancer has been reported. In a more recent study, the expression of PLEKHA7 protein in high grade ductal breast carcinomas, and lobular breast carcinomas was found to be very low or undetectable by immunofluorescence or immunohistochemistry, despite the detection of PLEKHA7 mRNA A Mayo Clinic study published online in August 2015 found that PLEKHA7 is mis-localized or lost in almost all breast and kidney tumor patient samples examined.
