= CAMSAP2 =

Protein found in humans

Identifiers
- Aliases: CAMSAP2, CAMSAP1L1, calmodulin regulated spectrin associated protein family member 2
- External IDs: OMIM: 613775; MGI: 1922434; GeneCards: CAMSAP2

Gene location (Human)
Chr.	Chromosome 1 (human)
Band	1q32.1	Start	200,738,893 bp
Band	1q32.1	End	200,860,704 bp

Gene location (Mouse)
Chr.	Chromosome 1 (mouse)
Band	1|1 E4	Start	136,195,861 bp
Band	1|1 E4	End	136,273,842 bp
RNA expression pattern
Bgee	Human / Mouse (ortholog); Top expressed in: lateral nuclear group of thalamus; postcentral gyrus; optic nerve; endothelial cell; middle temporal gyrus; superior frontal gyrus; entorhinal cortex; Brodmann area 23; Brodmann area 46; Region I of hippocampus proper / Top expressed in: otolith organ; utricle; superior cervical ganglion; trigeminal ganglion; zygote; substantia nigra; vestibular membrane of cochlear duct; secondary oocyte; Region I of hippocampus proper; fossa; More reference expression data
BioGPS	n/a
Gene ontology
Molecular function	microtubule binding; calmodulin binding; microtubule minus-end binding; spectrin binding; protein binding
Cellular component	cytoplasm; centrosome; microtubule; cytoskeleton; cytosol; microtubule end; microtubule minus-end; Golgi apparatus
Biological process	regulation of organelle organization; neuron projection development; microtubule cytoskeleton organization; regulation of microtubule polymerization; regulation of dendrite development; axon development; regulation of Golgi organization; negative regulation of microtubule depolymerization; cytoplasmic microtubule organization
Sources:Amigo / QuickGO
Orthologs
Databases	NCBI: entry; OMA: entry
Species	Human	Mouse
Entrez	23271	67886
Ensembl	ENSG00000118200	ENSMUSG00000041570
UniProt	Q08AD1	Q8C1B1
RefSeq (mRNA)	NM_001297707; NM_001297708; NM_203459; NM_001389638	NM_001081360; NM_001347109; NM_001347110
RefSeq (protein)	NP_001284636; NP_001284637; NP_982284	NP_001334038; NP_001334039
Location (UCSC)	Chr 1: 200.74 – 200.86 Mb	Chr 1: 136.2 – 136.27 Mb
PubMed search
- Wikidata
View/Edit Human	View/Edit Mouse

Calmodulin-regulated spectrin-associated protein family member 2 (CAMSAP2) is a protein in humans that is encoded by the CAMSAP2 gene. CAMSAP2 possesses a microtubule-binding domain near the C-terminal region where "microtubule interactions" occur. On the C-terminal regions, protein to protein interactions are accelerated by three coiled-coil domains, which function as molecular spacers. CAMSAP2 acts as a microtubule minus-end anchor and binds microtubules through its CKK domain. CAMSAP2 is necessary for the proper organization and stabilization of interphase microtubules. The protein also plays a role in cell migration. CAMSAP2 stabilizes and attaches microtubule minus ends to the Golgi through the AKAP9 complex and myomegalin. CLASP1 proteins are responsible for microtubule stability which are not required for the Golgi tethering. When no centromeres are present, AKAP9 and CAMSAP-2 dependent pathways of the microtubule minus ends become a dominant force and must exist in order to observe the maintenance of microtubule density.

== Structure ==
Microtubules are cytoskeletal polymers with structurally and functionally different ends. There exists a plus-end and a minus-end on each microtubule. The CAMSAP family of proteins contributes to regulating the minus-ends of microtubules. CAMSAP2 contains a CKK domain that binds to microtubules. The specific CKK domain is a defining factor of the CAMSAP protein family. It enables CAMSAP2 to recognize and bind to microtubule minus ends and allows CAMSAP2 to decorate and stabilize the microtubule lattice formed by minus-end polymerization. In addition to a CKK domain, CAMSAP2 contains an N-terminal calponin homology domain involved with actin binding.

== Function ==
=== Non-centrosomal microtubule maintenance ===
CAMSAP2 proteins are observed to be primarily responsible for the maintenance of non-centrosomal microtubules. In epithelial cells, major microtubules are not anchored to the centrosome, which can be observed in other cell types. CAMSAP2 cooperates with CAMSAP3 to achieve the organization observed in the non-centrosomal microtubules. They possess the ability to suppress the organization of microtubules by the centrosome, and the specific family of proteins is important for the suitable arrangement of organelles in the cell body. The proteins gathered at the minus ends of the non-centrosomal microtubules can stabilize them. Without these proteins, the Golgi apparatus would exhibit irregular distributions of the microtubules.

=== Pancreatic islet cells ===
In pancreatic β-cells, glucose stimulation leads to the remodeling of microtubules responsible for insulin secretion. CAMSAP2 binds to the minus ends of microtubules in normal clonal cells. The knockdown of CAMSAP2 in the β-cells reduces the total insulin content secreted through glucose-stimulated insulin secretion. CAMSAP2 localizes to the Golgi apparatus instead of the microtubule minus ends. The oddity is observed only in β-cells as opposed to α-cells. With the specific collection at the Golgi apparatus, CAMSAP2 promotes the protein trafficking of the Golgi, efficiently facilitating the process. Without CAMSAP2, there would not be adequate insulin production for secretion from the β-cells.

=== Migration ===
CAMSAP2-dependent microtubule organization promotes directional cell migration. CAMSAP2 is required for the proper organization of non-centrosomal interphase molecules. Depletion of CAMSAP2 leads to a mostly centrosome-anchored, radial microtubule array. CAMSAP2 is responsible for cell polarization because the stretches of CAMSAP2-decorated microtubules enable proper microtubule organization to achieve spatial redistribution and functional specialization of components in the cell. In wound healing assays, CAMSAP2 depletion reduced the ability of cells to close a wound, indicating impaired directional migration. CAMSAP2 populates the cytoplasm with microtubules, allowing the cell to regenerate its cytoskeleton and facilitate effective cell migration.

=== Microtubule nucleation ===
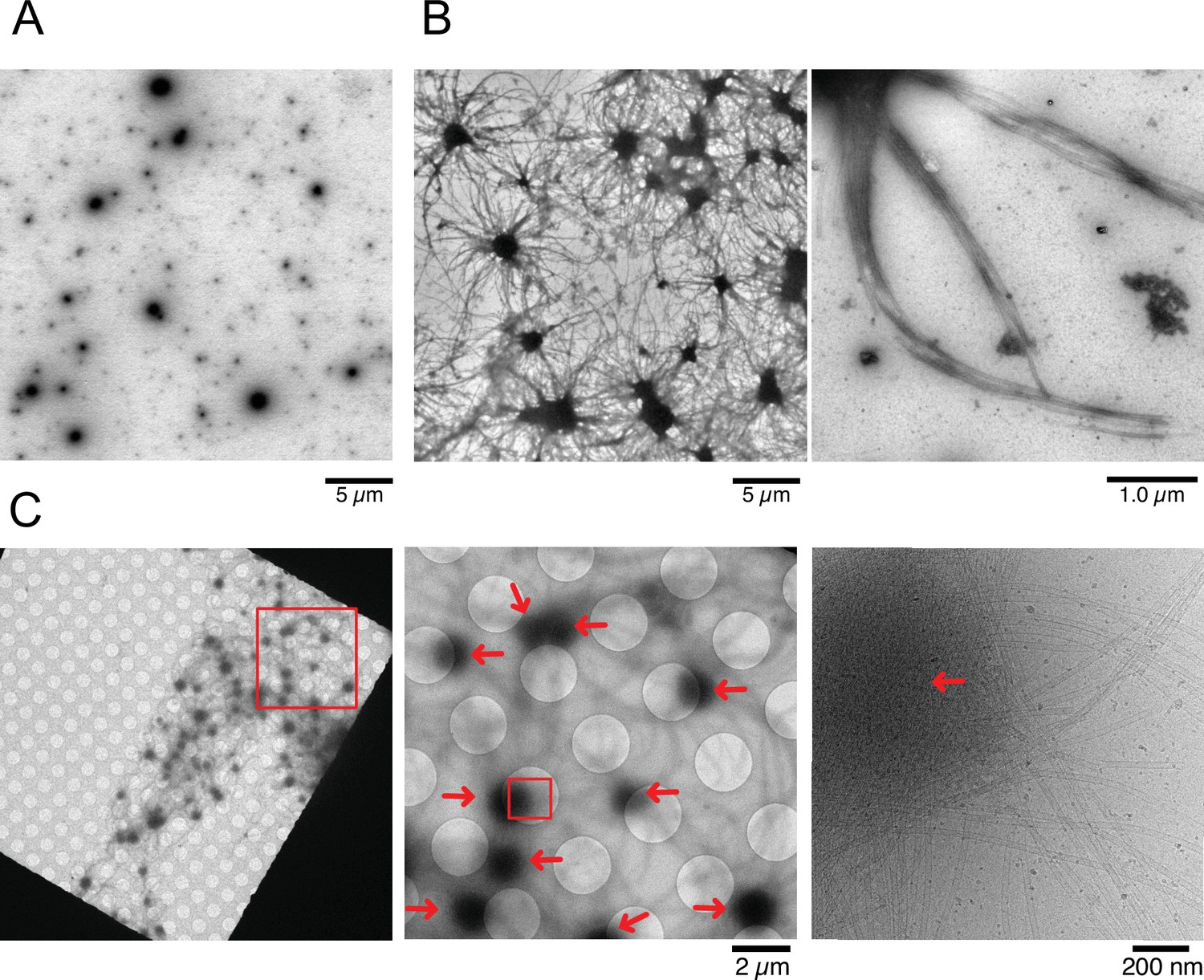
Nucleation and aster formation activity of CAMSAP2. Observe the microtubule projections from the black dots (CAMSAP2 complexes).

The initial polymerization of microtubules can be called "microtubule nucleation". The process occurs spontaneously via soluble αβ-tubulin dimers. Microtubule nucleation normally requires overcoming a large energy barrier inside of cells. Typically, a γ-tubulin ring complex is recruited to facilitate the nucleation process; however, CAMSAP2 can act as a strong nucleating agent for microtubule formation independent of the γ-tubulin. CAMSAP2 significantly reduces the nucleation energy barrier by stabilizing longitudinal interactions between the αβ-tubulin dimers, thereby increasing the critical concentration for nucleation. CAMSAP2 achieves the increase by clustering with the αβ-tubulin dimers to generate intermediates from which multiple microtubules can originate, promoting new astral microtubule growth.

== Regulation ==
=== Regulator of neuronal polarity and development ===
CAMSAP2 is responsible for controlling axon specification and dendrite development. In the brain, neurons normally are not associated with any central microtubule-organizing centers (MTOC). The phenomenon sees the existence of free minus and plus-ends throughout the cell. CAMSAP2 has an affinity for binding to free microtubule minus ends in the cell. The stabilization CAMSAP2 can achieve by binding to the free ends of the microtubules is important in regulating neuronal polarity. The highly polarized neurons are formed in the developing neocortex, and the centrosome loses its function as an MTOC. CAMSAP2 structures' stability-providing qualities ensure the fate of the axon and the development of neuronal polarity needed for neocortex development. Neurons lacking CAMSAP2 fail to begin axon formation and lack neuronal polarization.

=== Regulator of blood–testis barrier (BTB) ===
CAMSAP2 is involved in targeting microtubule minus-ends in Sertoli cell function. Sertoli cells are intrinsically polarized, with minus ends pointing toward the tubule lumen and plus ends toward the basement membrane of the seminiferous epithelium. The protein was found throughout the Sertoli cell cytosol colocalized with microtubules. The Sertoli cells are responsible for regulating the blood-testis barrier. CAMSAP2 appears along the seminiferous epithelium close to the basement membrane. It increases the function of the Sertoli cell tight junction. All of the microtubule-based tracks in Sertoli cells are crucial for the intracellular transport of organelles. CAMSAP2 is bound to the minus-ends of microtubules, slowing down the polymerization of free tubulins and effectively regulating their growth. By knocking down CAMSAP2 proteins in these regions, the growth of the tracks could support spermatogenesis and BTB dynamics. In a model of Sertoli cell injury, a knockdown of the CAMSAP2 promoted Sertoli cell tight junction barrier function, which suggests its role in tight junction remodeling. CAMSAP2 knockdown blocked the disruptive organization of microtubules and actin filaments caused by the injury, enabling proper distribution of BTB-associated proteins at the cell junctions.

== Clinical research ==
=== Hepatocellular carcinoma (HCC) ===
CAMSAP2 plays a role in the migration of cancer cells. It has been observed that CAMSAP2 is severely upregulated in cancers such as hepatocellular carcinoma (HCC). When placed in an assay of liver samples, an outgrowth of HCC cells was observed. Upon the depletion of CAMSAP2 from the samples, a drop in the prevalence of acetylated microtubules occurred. CAMSAP2 exhibited tumor-suppressing qualities by downregulating the histone deacetylase 6 (HDAC6) promoter region. CAMSAP2 activates a c-Jun transrepression of HDAC6 along the Trio-dependent Rac1/JNK pathway, inhibiting CAMSAP2-mediated HCC metastasis.

=== Colorectal cancer ===
CAMSAP2 promotes the migration of colorectal cancer cells by activating the JNK/c-Jun/MMP-1 signaling pathway. Acting as an oncogene, CAMSAP2 promotes the capabilities of migration in colorectal cells. Through the silencing of the gene, the substantial downstream target, MMP-1, regulated the invasion of the cells and slowed down disease progress. Metastasis of colorectal cancer permeates through the activation of the signaling pathway and indicates CAMSAP2 as a promising target for treating metastatic colorectal cancer patients.

=== Gastric cancer ===
An association between CAMSAP2 expression levels and the progression and prognosis of gastric cancer was investigated in 2023. The investigation into the expression of the CAMSAP2 protein in gastric cancer aimed to understand its effects on cell invasion and metastasis. One hundred six cancer patients underwent a radical gastrectomy, and they analyzed the expression levels of CAMSAP2 proteins. Gastric cancer MGC803 cells with CAMSAP2 overexpression and knockdown were studied for epithelial-mesenchymal transition, where epithelial cells acquire the invasive characteristics of mesenchymal cells. Researchers utilized a nude mouse model with orthotopic gastric cancer cell xenografts to verify the in vitro results. The scientists discovered that gastric cancer tissues demonstrated high levels of CAMSAP2. The results positively correlated with tumor markers carcinoembryonic antigen and CA19-9. Bioinformatics analysis suggested CAMSAP2 is involved in epithelial-mesenchymal transition and the upregulation of TGF-β signaling. In the mouse model, CAMSAP2 overexpressing xenografts illustrated enhanced metastasis, increased vimentin and N-cadherin, and decreased E-cadherin. The high expression of CAMSAP2 contributes to gastric cancer progression and poor prognosis by the upregulation of TGF-β signaling.

== See also ==
- CAMSAP3
- CAMSAP1
