= Small nucleolar RNA-derived microRNA =

In molecular biology, small nucleolar RNA derived microRNAs are microRNAs (miRNA) derived from small nucleolar RNA (snoRNA). MicroRNAs are usually derived from precursors known as pre-miRNAs, these pre-miRNAs are recognised and cleaved from a pri-miRNA precursor by the Pasha and Drosha proteins. However some microRNAs, mirtrons, are known to be derived from introns via a different pathway which bypasses Pasha and Drosha. Some microRNAs are also known to be derived from small nucleolar RNA.

== Discovery ==
Small nucleolar RNA derived microRNA was first described in 2008. The protozoal intestinal parasite Giardia lamblia lacks the Drosha protein involved in pre-miRNA cleavage from pri-miRNA. However the miRNA processing protein dicer is found in Giardia. A 26 nucleotide RNA, miR2, is processed from the Giardia lamblia snoRNA GlsR17 by dicer. MiR2 is a microRNA which may regulate the expression of variant surface proteins.

Also in 2008, a small RNA was found to be cleaved from SCARNA15, a Human small Cajal body-specific RNA, by Dicer. This small RNA was found to function as a microRNA. Potential microRNAs were also identified in several other Human snoRNAs.

== Giardia snoRNA-derived miRNAs ==
Giardia lamblia produces at least 20 snoRNAs. SnoRNAs guide the modification of rRNA, and contain a region of 10–21 nucleotides which is complementary to the target RNA. Five of the Giardia lamblia snoRNAs have no complementarities to rRNA, implying that they may have a different function. MicroRNAs are derived from five of the box C/D snoRNAs from Giardia lamblia:

- The microRNA miR2 is derived from the snoRNA GlsR17 and may regulate the expression of variant surface proteins
- The microRNA miR3 is derived from the snoRNA GlsR16
- The microRNA miR5 is derived from the snoRNA GlsR2. MiR5 may regulate the expression of several different genes, including four kinases and three variant surface proteins. The variant surface proteins are different from those potentially regulated by miR2
- The microRNA miR6 is derived from the snoRNA GlsR1. The predicted target sites for this miRNA include variant surface proteins
- The microRNA miR10 is derived from the snoRNA GlsR8. The predicted target sites for this miRNA include variant surface proteins

== See also ==
- MicroRNA
- Small nucleolar RNA
