= TsRNA =

TsRNA can stand for:

- Toxic Small RNA
- tRNA-derived small RNA
