= MicroRNA 885 =

MIR885

Identifiers
- Aliases: MIR885, MIRN885, hsa-mir-885, mir-885, microRNA 885
- External IDs: GeneCards: MIR885; OMA:MIR885 - orthologs

Gene location (Human)
Chr.	Chromosome 3 (human)
Band	3p25.3	Start	10,394,489 bp
Band	3p25.3	End	10,394,562 bp
RNA expression pattern
Bgee	Human / Mouse (ortholog); Top expressed in: muscle of leg; substantia nigra; right lobe of liver; tibial nerve; Brodmann area 9; right frontal lobe; putamen; ascending aorta; amygdala; skin of leg / n/a; More reference expression data
BioGPS	n/a
Orthologs
Species	Human	Mouse
Entrez	100126334	n/a
Ensembl	ENSG00000216135	n/a
UniProt	n a	n/a
RefSeq (mRNA)	n/a	n/a
RefSeq (protein)	n/a	n/a
Location (UCSC)	Chr 3: 10.39 – 10.39 Mb	n/a
PubMed search		n/a
- Wikidata
View/Edit Human

MicroRNA 885 is a protein that in humans is encoded by the MIR885 gene.

== Function ==
microRNAs (miRNAs) are short (20-24 nt) non-coding RNAs that are involved in post-transcriptional regulation of gene expression in multicellular organisms by affecting both the stability and translation of mRNAs. miRNAs are transcribed by RNA polymerase II as part of capped and polyadenylated primary transcripts (pri-miRNAs) that can be either protein-coding or non-coding. The primary transcript is cleaved by the Drosha ribonuclease III enzyme to produce an approximately 70-nt stem-loop precursor miRNA (pre-miRNA), which is further cleaved by the cytoplasmic Dicer ribonuclease to generate the mature miRNA and antisense miRNA star (miRNA*) products.

The mature miRNA is incorporated into a RNA-induced silencing complex (RISC), which recognizes target mRNAs through imperfect base pairing with the miRNA and most commonly results in translational inhibition or destabilization of the target mRNA. The RefSeq represents the predicted microRNA stem-loop. [provided by RefSeq, Sep 2009].
