= Toxic Small RNA =

In molecular biology, Toxic Small RNA (tsRNA, not to be confused with tRNA-derived small RNA) is a family of trans-encoded small non-coding RNA found exclusively in intergenic regions of Betaproteobacteria. Several paralogous loci may encode similar (but not identical) tsRNAs in each coding genome. Typically, each species of Burkholderia has 3-5 homologous tsRNAs. Experiments with four species of the Burkholderia lineage showed conserved and constitutive expression of tsRNAs in logarithmic growth phases.

== Sequence and structure ==
Characterization of the secondary structures of 4 tsRNAs in Burkholderia cenocepacia suggests they form double hairpin structures. Sometimes, this structure only results after the RNA is processed (as in ncS27). Typically, there is a CU-rich (Cytosine and Uracil rich) region in the unpaired segments of the secondary structure. This CU-rich region is suggested to be the functional region that binds the ribosome-binding site (RBS) of mRNAs.

== Function ==
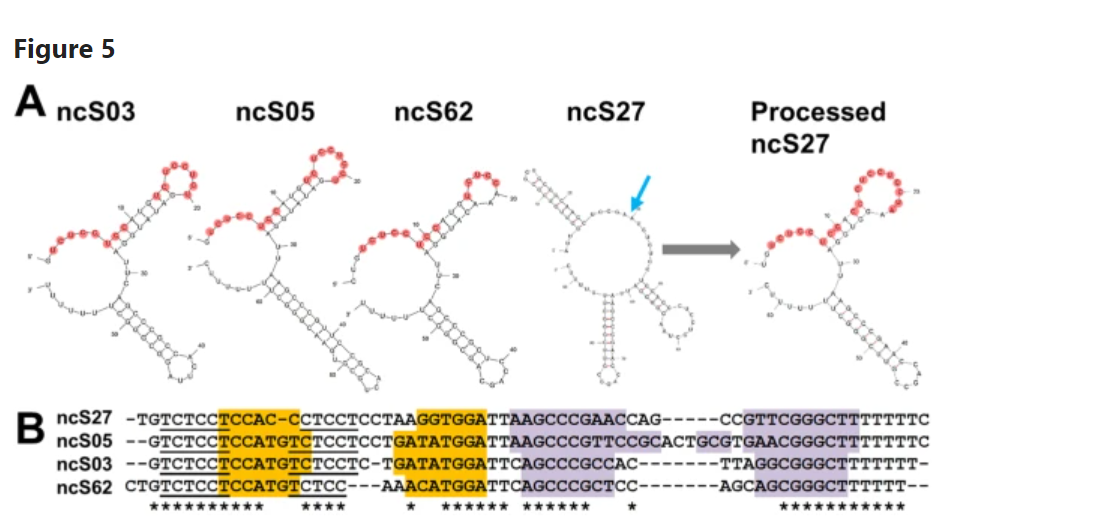
Secondary hairpin loop structures of processed nsS27 and 3 other tsRNAs generated from dRNA-seq data. The secondary structure of unprocessed ncS27 was also identified.

While the mechanism of action may vary depending on the target, it has been suggested that tsRNAs regulate gene expression by binding the ribosome binding sequence of multiple mRNAs. The low GC (Guanine and Cytosine) content of tsRNAs found in Herbaspirillum seropedicae would support this hypothesis. It is possible that chaperone protein Hfq is needed to stabilize this interaction, but its role remains unclear.

Broadly, it is suggested that tsRNAs regulate carbohydrate and amino acid metabolism in Burkholderia. They are more highly expressed when B. cenocepacia is grown in a glucose-rich medium than in a starvation environment. Conversely, overexpression of tsRNAs impairs growth in an amino-acid rich environment. This attenuation of growth depends on the specific contents of the medium, as normal growth still occurs in many environments.

While most specific tsRNAs remain largely uncharacterized, the function of ncS27 has been studied. It contains a conserved sequence that is the reverse complement of the Shine-Dalgarno sequence of many transport and metabolic transcripts. Likely targets include many genes that regulate carbohydrate transport and the degradation of aromatic amino acids. Specific targets include 4-hydroxyphenylpyruvic acid dioxygenase (hppD) and indolepyruvate ferredoxin oxidoreductase (ior). These enzymes are involved in phenylalanine and tyrosine catabolism. Other possible targets include glycerol kinase and substrate binding proteins in ATP-binding cassette transporters (ABC transporters). Therefore, many pieces of evidence suggest that tsRNAs regulate carbohydrate and amino acid metabolism, however, the function has not been confirmed as such.

A relatively unstudied tsRNA, ncS62, has been suggested to be essential based on Tn-Seq data.

== History ==
Originally, tsRNAs were named as they were found to inhibit E. coli growth when expressed on a cloning vector. The mechanism by which tsRNAs are toxic is still unknown. tsRNAs are not toxic to E. coli when in the growth medium, nor are they secreted by B. cenocepacia when grown with E. coli. Additionally, they are not toxic to the bacteria in which these RNA molecules are found (B. cenocepacia). A name change has been suggested for this family of ncRNAs. Based on their structure, certain tsRNAs have been proposed to be called ‘double hairpin RNAs’. A tsRNA originally identified in 2015 (ncS27) is suggested the name, BdhR1, for Burkholderia double-hairpin sRNA regulator.

== See also ==
- Escherichia coli sRNA
- Extracellular RNA
- List of RNAs
- Rfam
- RNA interference
- Small interfering RNA
- Small nucleolar RNA-derived microRNA
