= MicroRNA 5680 =

Non-coding RNA in the species Homo sapiens

MIR5680

Identifiers
- Aliases: MIR5680, microRNA 5680
- External IDs: GeneCards: MIR5680; OMA:MIR5680 - orthologs

Gene location (Human)
Chr.	Chromosome 8 (human)
Band	8q22.3	Start	102,125,432 bp
Band	8q22.3	End	102,125,515 bp
RNA expression pattern
Bgee	Human / Mouse (ortholog); Top expressed in: duodenum; muscle of leg; gastrocnemius muscle; blood; endometrium; left ventricle; tibial arteries; dorsolateral prefrontal cortex; minor salivary glands; right lung / n/a; More reference expression data
BioGPS	n/a
Orthologs
Species	Human	Mouse
Entrez	100847001	n/a
Ensembl	ENSG00000266756	n/a
UniProt	n a	n/a
RefSeq (mRNA)	n/a	n/a
RefSeq (protein)	n/a	n/a
Location (UCSC)	Chr 8: 102.13 – 102.13 Mb	n/a
PubMed search		n/a
- Wikidata
View/Edit Human

MicroRNA 5680 is a protein that in humans is encoded by the MIR5680 gene.

== Function ==
microRNAs (miRNAs) are short (20-24 nt) non-coding RNAs that are involved in post-transcriptional regulation of gene expression in multicellular organisms by affecting both the stability and translation of mRNAs. miRNAs are transcribed by RNA polymerase II as part of capped and polyadenylated primary transcripts (pri-miRNAs) that can be either protein-coding or non-coding. The primary transcript is cleaved by the Drosha ribonuclease III enzyme to produce an approximately 70-nt stem-loop precursor miRNA (pre-miRNA), which is further cleaved by the cytoplasmic Dicer ribonuclease to generate the mature miRNA and antisense miRNA star (miRNA*) products. The mature miRNA is incorporated into a RNA-induced silencing complex (RISC), which recognizes target mRNAs through imperfect base pairing with the miRNA and most commonly results in translational inhibition or destabilization of the target mRNA. The RefSeq represents the predicted microRNA stem-loop.
