= MIR1271 =

Non-coding RNA in the species Homo sapiens

Identifiers
- Aliases: MIR1271, MIRN1271, hsa-mir-1271, microRNA 1271
- External IDs: GeneCards: MIR1271; OMA:MIR1271 - orthologs

Gene location (Human)
Chr.	Chromosome 5 (human)
Band	5q35.2	Start	176,367,946 bp
Band	5q35.2	End	176,368,031 bp
RNA expression pattern
Bgee	Human / Mouse (ortholog); Top expressed in: appendix; blood; fundus; right lobe of thyroid gland; muscle of leg; bone marrow; gastrocnemius muscle; monocyte; islet of Langerhans; human kidney / n/a; More reference expression data
BioGPS	n/a
Orthologs
Species	Human	Mouse
Entrez	100302203	n/a
Ensembl	ENSG00000221464	n/a
UniProt	n a	n/a
RefSeq (mRNA)	n/a	n/a
RefSeq (protein)	n/a	n/a
Location (UCSC)	Chr 5: 176.37 – 176.37 Mb	n/a
PubMed search		n/a
- Wikidata
View/Edit Human

MicroRNA 1271 is a microRNA that in humans is encoded by the MIR1271 gene.

== Function ==
microRNAs (miRNAs) are short (20-24 nt) non-coding RNAs that are involved in post-transcriptional regulation of gene expression in multicellular organisms by affecting both the stability and translation of mRNAs. miRNAs are transcribed by RNA polymerase II as part of capped and polyadenylated primary transcripts (pri-miRNAs) that can be either protein-coding or non-coding.

The primary transcript is cleaved by the Drosha ribonuclease III enzyme to produce an approximately 70-nt stem-loop precursor miRNA (pre-miRNA), which is further cleaved by the cytoplasmic Dicer ribonuclease to generate the mature miRNA and antisense miRNA star (miRNA*) products.

The mature miRNA is incorporated into a RNA-induced silencing complex (RISC), which recognizes target mRNAs through imperfect base pairing with the miRNA and most commonly results in translational inhibition or destabilization of the target mRNA. The RefSeq represents the predicted microRNA stem-loop.
