= MIR941-1 =

Non-coding RNA in the species Homo sapiens

Identifiers
- Aliases: MIR941-1, MIRN941-1, mir-941-1, microRNA 941-1
- External IDs: GeneCards: MIR941-1

Gene location (Human)
Chr.	Chromosome 20 (human)
Band	20q13.33	Start	63,919,449 bp
Band	20q13.33	End	63,919,520 bp
RNA expression pattern
Bgee	Human / Mouse (ortholog); Top expressed in: sural nerve; skeletal muscle tissue; prefrontal cortex; blood; bone marrow; duodenum; endometrium; Achilles tendon; monocyte; liver / n/a; More reference expression data
BioGPS	n/a
Orthologs
Databases	NCBI: entry; OMA: entry
Species	Human	Mouse
Entrez	100126329	n/a
Ensembl	ENSG00000283206	n/a
UniProt	n a	n/a
RefSeq (mRNA)	n/a	n/a
RefSeq (protein)	n/a	n/a
Location (UCSC)	Chr 20: 63.92 – 63.92 Mb	n/a
PubMed search		n/a
- Wikidata
View/Edit Human

MicroRNA 941-1 is a human specific microRNA that is encoded by the MIR941-1 gene.

== Function ==
microRNAs (miRNAs) are short (20-24 nt) non-coding RNAs that are involved in post-transcriptional regulation of gene expression in multicellular organisms by affecting both the stability and translation of mRNAs. miRNAs are transcribed by RNA polymerase II as part of capped and polyadenylated primary transcripts (pri-miRNAs) that can be either protein-coding or non-coding. The primary transcript is cleaved by the Drosha ribonuclease III enzyme to produce an approximately 70-nt stem-loop precursor miRNA (pre-miRNA), which is further cleaved by the cytoplasmic Dicer ribonuclease to generate the mature miRNA and antisense miRNA star (miRNA*) products. The mature miRNA is incorporated into a RNA-induced silencing complex (RISC), which recognizes target mRNAs through imperfect base pairing with the miRNA and most commonly results in translational inhibition or destabilization of the target mRNA. The RefSeq represents the predicted microRNA stem-loop.

== Evolution ==
The miR-941 gene is only found in humans where it first appeared between one and six million years ago. Its copy number and binding sites have decreased with migration out of Africa. miR-941 regulates genes involved in cellular differentiation and neurotransmitter signalling.
