= CAMSAP1 =

Microtubule minus-end binding human protein

Identifiers
- Aliases: CAMSAP1, PRO2405, bA100C15.1, calmodulin regulated spectrin associated protein 1
- External IDs: OMIM: 613774; MGI: 3036242; HomoloGene: 19202; GeneCards: CAMSAP1; OMA:CAMSAP1 - orthologs

Gene location (Mouse)
| Chr. | Chromosome 2 (mouse) |
| Band | 2|2 A3 | Start | 25,816,850 bp |
| Band | 2|2 A3 | End | 25,873,294 bp |
RNA expression pattern
| Bgee | Human / Mouse (ortholog); Top expressed in: secondary oocyte; endothelial cell; ganglionic eminence; sperm; middle temporal gyrus; amniotic fluid; Brodmann area 23; gastrocnemius muscle; corpus callosum; Cerebellum / Top expressed in: tail of embryo; Rostral migratory stream; neural layer of retina; zygote; primary oocyte; secondary oocyte; genital tubercle; otic vesicle; ventromedial nucleus; lateral septal nucleus; More reference expression data |
| BioGPS | n/a |
Gene ontology
| Molecular function | spectrin binding; calmodulin binding; microtubule binding; microtubule minus-end binding |
| Cellular component | cytoskeleton; cytoplasm; microtubule; microtubule minus-end |
| Biological process | cytoskeleton organization; regulation of cell morphogenesis; neuron projection development; microtubule cytoskeleton organization; regulation of microtubule polymerization; negative regulation of microtubule depolymerization; cytoplasmic microtubule organization |
Sources:Amigo / QuickGO
Orthologs
| Species | Human | Mouse |
| Entrez | 157922 | 227634 |
| Ensembl | n/a | ENSMUSG00000026933 |
| UniProt | Q5T5Y3 | A2AHC3 |
| RefSeq (mRNA) | NM_015447 | NM_001115076; NM_001276359; NM_001276360; NM_001276361; NM_001372499 |
| RefSeq (protein) | NP_056262 | NP_001263288; NP_001263289; NP_001263290; NP_001359428; NP_001394979 NP_001394980; NP_001394981; NP_001394982; NP_001394983 |
| Location (UCSC) | n/a | Chr 2: 25.82 – 25.87 Mb |
| PubMed search |
- Wikidata
| View/Edit Human | View/Edit Mouse |

Calmodulin-regulated spectrin-associated protein 1 (CAMSAP1) is a human protein encoded by the gene CAMSAP1. Like other CAMSAP-family proteins, it is a microtubule minus-end anchor, and binds microtubules through its CKK domain.

== Clinical significance ==
CAMSAP1 is vital for neuron polarisation, and so mice that lack CAMSAP1 die of epileptic seizures.

== See also ==
- CAMSAP2
- CAMSAP3
