= MicroRNA let-7a-2 =

MIRLET7A2

Identifiers
- Aliases: MIRLET7A2, LET7A2, MIRNLET7A2, let-7a-2, microRNA let-7a-2
- External IDs: OMIM: 612142; GeneCards: MIRLET7A2; OMA:MIRLET7A2 - orthologs

Gene location (Human)
Chr.	Chromosome 11 (human)
Band	11q24.1	Start	122,146,522 bp
Band	11q24.1	End	122,146,593 bp
RNA expression pattern
Bgee	Human / Mouse (ortholog); Top expressed in: Achilles tendon; kidney; endometrium; blood; stomach; liver; left uterine tube; body of stomach; monocyte; intestine / n/a; More reference expression data
BioGPS	n/a
Orthologs
Species	Human	Mouse
Entrez	406882	n/a
Ensembl	ENSG00000198975	n/a
UniProt	n a	n/a
RefSeq (mRNA)	n/a	n/a
RefSeq (protein)	n/a	n/a
Location (UCSC)	Chr 11: 122.15 – 122.15 Mb	n/a
PubMed search		n/a
- Wikidata
View/Edit Human

MicroRNA let-7a-2 is a ncRNA that in humans is encoded by the MIRLET7A2 gene.

== Function ==
microRNAs (miRNAs) are short (20-24 nt) non-coding RNAs that are involved in post-transcriptional regulation of gene expression in multicellular organisms by affecting both the stability and translation of mRNAs. miRNAs are transcribed by RNA polymerase II as part of capped and polyadenylated primary transcripts (pri-miRNAs) that can be either protein-coding or non-coding. The primary transcript is cleaved by the Drosha ribonuclease III enzyme to produce an approximately 70-nt stem-loop precursor miRNA (pre-miRNA), which is further cleaved by the cytoplasmic Dicer ribonuclease to generate the mature miRNA and antisense miRNA star (miRNA*) products. The mature miRNA is incorporated into a RNA-induced silencing complex (RISC), which recognizes target mRNAs through imperfect base pairing with the miRNA and most commonly results in translational inhibition or destabilization of the target mRNA. The RefSeq represents the predicted microRNA stem-loop.
