= Sandra Citi =

- Occupations: Cell biologist and academic

Academic background
- Education: B.Sc., Biology; Ph.D., Biology; M.D.
- Alma mater: University of Florence; MRC Laboratory of Molecular Biology

Academic work
- Institutions: University of Geneva; University of Padova; Cornell University Medical College

Sandra Citi is a cell biologist and academic. She discovered the protein cingulin in the 1980s. Her work and research interests focus on the molecular mechanisms underlying the function of epithelial cell junctions and their connection to the cytoskeleton, including studies on proteins such as cingulin, paracingulin, ZO-1, and PLEKHA7.

== Education ==
Citi completed her Bachelor of Science in Biological Sciences from the University of Florence in 1982. She was trained in the Structural Studies Division of the MRC Laboratory of Molecular Biology in Cambridge, UK, where she received a Ph.D. in 1986. After completing her Ph.D., she carried out postdoctoral work at the Weizmann Institute of Science in 1987. In 1989, she earned a M.D. degree from the University of Florence.

== Career ==
Citi began her academic career in 1989 as an assistant professor of Cell Biology and Anatomy at Cornell University Medical College, New York, a position she held until 1993. She moved to the University of Padova, Italy, in 1994, where she worked as an assistant professor until 2009. Between 1996 and 2025, she was a principal investigator and associate professor in the Department of Molecular and Cellular Biology at the University of Geneva. She received independent funding from the Swiss National Science Foundation.

== Research ==
Citi's research has focused on the molecular organization, function, and regulation of epithelial junctions. Her work has particularly focused on the protein cingulin, which she discovered in the 1980s, highlighting its structural functions in tethering nonmuscle myosins-2 to tight junctions and its role in regulating the expression of tight junction proteins during epithelial differentiation. She also investigated paracingulin (CGNL1), demonstrating its involvement in linking microtubules to tight junctions through CAMSAP3, and examined its significance in the regulation of GEFs and GAPs. She showed that kinase signaling regulates cadherin-mediated adhesion by modulating cytoskeletal contractility. She also conducted studies on the expression, localization, and phosphorylation of tight junction proteins.

Citi has also studied how molecular interactions and mechanical forces influence junctional components, showing that tension induces conformational changes in the major tight junction scaffolding protein Tight junction protein ZO-1 (TJP1), leading to nuclear signaling events that regulate cell proliferation and barrier function. She also reported that tight junctions act not only as barriers but also as dynamic signaling platforms and are involved in mechanotransduction to regulate apical cortex mechanics. Her work also clarified to the role of PLEKHA proteins in the trafficking and function of the copper pump ATP7A and in host-pathogen interactions. Additionally, her work has also linked alterations in junctional proteins such as Claudin-1 and PLEKHA7 to cancer progression, observing their reduced expression in lung and breast carcinomas.

== Awards and honors ==
- 2004–2005 – Radcliffe Fellowship, Harvard University

== Selected articles ==
- Citi, S; Sabanay, H; Jakes, R; Geiger, B; Kendrick-Jones, J (1988-05-19). "Cingulin, a new peripheral component of tight junctions". Nature. 333 (6170): 272–276. Bibcode:1988Natur.333..272C. doi:10.1038/333272a0. PMID 3285223.
- Spadaro, Domenica; Le, Shimin; Laroche, Thierry; Mean, Isabelle; Jond, Lionel; Yan, Jie; Citi, Sandra (2017). "Tension-Dependent Stretching Activates ZO-1 to Control the Junctional Localization of Its Interactors". Current Biology. 27 (24): 3783–3795.e8. Bibcode:2017CBio...27E3783S. doi:10.1016/j.cub.2017.11.014. PMID 29199076.
- Shah, Jimit; Rouaud, Florian; Guerrera, Diego; Vasileva, Ekaterina; Popov, Lauren M; Kelley, William L; Rubinstein, Eric; Carette, Jan E; Amieva, Manuel R; Citi, Sandra (2018). "A Dock-and-Lock Mechanism Clusters ADAM10 at Cell-Cell Junctions to Promote α-Toxin Cytotoxicity". Cell Reports. 25 (8): 2132–2147.e7. doi:10.1016/j.celrep.2018.10.088. PMID 30463011.
- Sluysmans, Sophie; Méan, Isabelle; Xiao, Tong; Boukhatemi, Amina; Ferreira, Flavio; Jond, Lionel; Mutero, Annick; Chang, Christopher J.; Citi, Sandra (2021). "PLEKHA5, PLEKHA6, and PLEKHA7 bind to PDZD11 to target the Menkes ATPase ATP7A to the cell periphery and regulate copper homeostasis". Molecular Biology of the Cell. 32 (21) ar34. doi:10.1091/mbc.E21-07-0355. PMID 34613798.
- Rouaud, Florian; Huang, Wenmao; Flinois, Arielle; Jain, Kunalika; Vasileva, Ekaterina; Di Mattia, Thomas; Mauperin, Marine; Parry, David A.D.; Dugina, Vera; Chaponnier, Christine; Méan, Isabelle; Montessuit, Sylvie; Mutero-Maeda, Annick; Yan, Jie; Citi, Sandra (2023). "Cingulin and paracingulin tether myosins-2 to junctions to mechanoregulate the plasma membrane". Journal of Cell Biology. 222 (7) e202208065. doi:10.1083/jcb.202208065. PMC 10202830. PMID 37204781.
- Maupérin, Marine; Sun, Yuze; Glandorf, Thomas; Oswald, Tabea Anne; Klatt, Niklas; Geil, Burkhard; Mutero-Maeda, Annick; Méan, Isabelle; Jond, Lionel; Janshoff, Andreas; Yan, Jie; Citi, Sandra (2025). "A feedback circuitry involving γ-actin, β-actin and nonmuscle myosin-2 A controls tight junction and apical cortex mechanics". Nature Communications. 16: 2514. doi:10.1038/s41467-025-2514-7 (inactive 15 December 2025).
