= MicroRNA 486-1 =

Non-coding RNA in the species Homo sapiens

MIR486-1

Identifiers
- Aliases: MIR486-1, MIR486, MIRN486, hsa-mir-486, hsa-mir-486-1, mir-486-1, microRNA 486-1
- External IDs: GeneCards: MIR486-1; OMA:MIR486-1 - orthologs

Gene location (Human)
Chr.	Chromosome 8 (human)
Band	8p11.21	Start	41,660,441 bp
Band	8p11.21	End	41,660,508 bp
RNA expression pattern
Bgee	Human / Mouse (ortholog); Top expressed in: skeletal muscle tissue; apex of heart; bone marrow; right hemisphere of cerebellum; muscle of leg; gastrocnemius muscle; gonad; left ventricle; lymph node; right auricle of heart / n/a; More reference expression data
BioGPS	n/a
Orthologs
Species	Human	Mouse
Entrez	619554	n/a
Ensembl	ENSG00000274705	n/a
UniProt	n a	n/a
RefSeq (mRNA)	n/a	n/a
RefSeq (protein)	n/a	n/a
Location (UCSC)	Chr 8: 41.66 – 41.66 Mb	n/a
PubMed search		n/a
- Wikidata
View/Edit Human

MicroRNA 486-1 is a functional RNA that in humans is encoded by the MIR486-1 gene.

== Function ==
microRNAs (miRNAs) are short (20-24 nt) non-coding RNAs that are involved in post-transcriptional regulation of gene expression in multicellular organisms by affecting both the stability and translation of mRNAs. miRNAs are transcribed by RNA polymerase II as part of capped and polyadenylated primary transcripts (pri-miRNAs) that can be either protein-coding or non-coding. The primary transcript is cleaved by the Drosha ribonuclease III enzyme to produce an approximately 70-nt stem-loop precursor miRNA (pre-miRNA), which is further cleaved by the cytoplasmic Dicer ribonuclease to generate the mature miRNA and antisense miRNA star (miRNA*) products. The mature miRNA is incorporated into a RNA-induced silencing complex (RISC), which recognizes target mRNAs through imperfect base pairing with the miRNA and most commonly results in translational inhibition or destabilization of the target mRNA. The RefSeq represents the predicted microRNA stem-loop.
