= MIR124-3 =

Identifiers
- Aliases: MIR124-3, MIRN124-3, MIRN124A3, mir-124-3, microRNA 124-3
- External IDs: GeneCards: MIR124-3; OMA:MIR124-3 - orthologs

Gene location (Human)
Chr.	Chromosome 20 (human)
Band	20q13.33	Start	63,178,500 bp
Band	20q13.33	End	63,178,586 bp
RNA expression pattern
Bgee	Human / Mouse (ortholog); Top expressed in: blood; putamen; body of pancreas; tibial arteries; body of stomach; vagina; dorsolateral prefrontal cortex; Brodmann area 9; anterior cingulate cortex; right auricle / n/a; More reference expression data
BioGPS	n/a
Orthologs
Species	Human	Mouse
Entrez	406909	n/a
Ensembl	ENSG00000207598	n/a
UniProt	n a	n/a
RefSeq (mRNA)	n/a	n/a
RefSeq (protein)	n/a	n/a
Location (UCSC)	Chr 20: 63.18 – 63.18 Mb	n/a
PubMed search		n/a
- Wikidata
View/Edit Human

MicroRNA 124-3 is a protein that in humans is encoded by the MIR124-3 gene.

== Function ==
MicroRNAs (miRNAs) are short (20-24 nt) non-coding RNAs that are involved in post-transcriptional regulation of gene expression in multicellular organisms by affecting both the stability and translation of mRNAs. miRNAs are transcribed by RNA polymerase II as part of capped and polyadenylated primary transcripts (pri-miRNAs) that can be either protein-coding or non-coding. The primary transcript is cleaved by the Drosha ribonuclease III enzyme to produce an approximately 70-nt stem-loop precursor miRNA (pre-miRNA), which is further cleaved by the cytoplasmic Dicer ribonuclease to generate the mature miRNA and antisense miRNA star (miRNA*) products. The mature miRNA is incorporated into a RNA-induced silencing complex (RISC), which recognizes target mRNAs through imperfect base pairing with the miRNA and most commonly results in translational inhibition or destabilization of the target mRNA. The RefSeq represents the predicted microRNA stem-loop. [provided by RefSeq, Sep 2009].
