= MicroRNA 196b =

Non-coding RNA in the species Homo sapiens

MIR196B

Identifiers
- Aliases: MIR196B, MIRN196B, miR-196b, miRNA196B, microRNA 196b
- External IDs: OMIM: 609688; GeneCards: MIR196B; OMA:MIR196B - orthologs

Gene location (Human)
| Chr. | Chromosome 7 (human) |
| Band | 7p15.2 | Start | 27,169,480 bp |
| Band | 7p15.2 | End | 27,169,563 bp |
RNA expression pattern
| Bgee | Human / Mouse (ortholog); Top expressed in: endometrium; blood; left adrenal gland; glomerulus; gastrocnemius muscle; left lobe of thyroid gland; prostate; skin of leg; subcutaneous adipose tissue; pituitary gland / n/a; More reference expression data |
| BioGPS | n/a |
Orthologs
| Species | Human | Mouse |
| Entrez | 442920 | n/a |
| Ensembl | ENSG00000283745 | n/a |
| UniProt | n a | n/a |
| RefSeq (mRNA) | n/a | n/a |
| RefSeq (protein) | n/a | n/a |
| Location (UCSC) | Chr 7: 27.17 – 27.17 Mb | n/a |
| PubMed search | | n/a |
- Wikidata
| View/Edit Human |

MicroRNA 196b is a protein that in humans is encoded by the MIR196B gene.

== Function ==
microRNAs (miRNAs) are short (20-24 nt) non-coding RNAs that are involved in post-transcriptional regulation of gene expression in multicellular organisms by affecting both the stability and translation of mRNAs.

miRNAs are transcribed by RNA polymerase II as part of capped and polyadenylated primary transcripts (pri-miRNAs) that can be either protein-coding or non-coding. The primary transcript is cleaved by the Drosha ribonuclease III enzyme to produce an approximately 70-nt stem-loop precursor miRNA (pre-miRNA), which is further cleaved by the cytoplasmic Dicer ribonuclease to generate the mature miRNA and antisense miRNA star (miRNA*) products.

The mature miRNA is incorporated into a RNA-induced silencing complex (RISC), which recognizes target mRNAs through imperfect base pairing with the miRNA and most commonly results in translational inhibition or destabilization of the target mRNA. The RefSeq represents the predicted microRNA stem-loop. [provided by RefSeq, Sep 2009].
