= RncO =

Bacterial non-coding RNA regulatory element

rncO
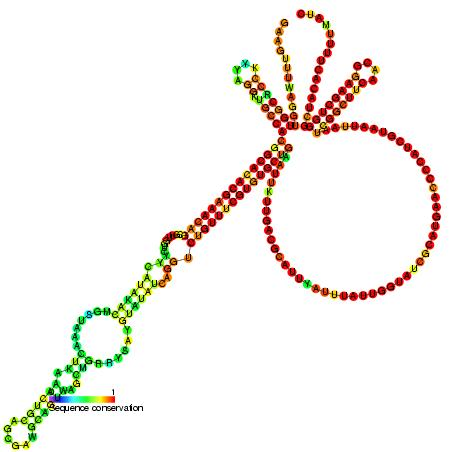
- Predicted secondary structure and sequence conservation of rncO

Identifiers
- Symbol: rncO
- Rfam: RF00552

Other data
- RNA type: Cis-reg
- Domain(s): Bacteria
- SO: SO:0000233
- PDB structures: PDBe

RncO is a bacterial non-coding RNA regulatory element found in the rnc leader sequence. The rnc operon is negatively auto-regulated by transcript stability. rnc, the first gene in the operon codes for RNase III which cleaves the long rncO stem II leading to transcript degradation and a reduction in translation. Matsunaga et al. showed that RNase III cleavage can initiate rnc transcript decay independently of rnc gene translation. Further work has established that rncO structure and function is conserved in Salmonella typhimurium.

== Structure ==
Functionally the first 215 nucleotides of the rnc leader have been shown to be sufficient. Within this region three stem-loops were identified. Stem-loop II is cleaved by RNase III, whereas stem-loops I and III are important for stability.
