= MiR-150 =

Family of microRNA precursors found in mammals

miR-150
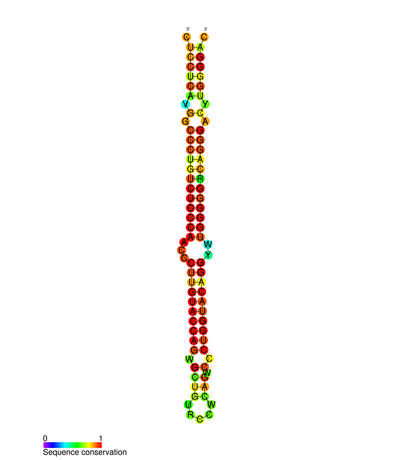
- Conserved secondary structure of miR-150 microRNA precursor

Identifiers
- Symbol: miR-150
- Alt. Symbols: MIR150
- Rfam: RF00767
- miRBase: MI0000479
- miRBase family: MIPF0000197
- NCBI Gene: 406942
- HGNC: 31537
- OMIM: 610566
- RefSeq: NR_029703

Other data
- RNA type: miRNA
- Domain: Mammalia
- GO: 0035195
- SO: 0001244
- Locus: Chr. 19 q13.33
- PDB structures: PDBe

miR-150 is a family of microRNA precursors found in mammals, including humans. The ~22 nucleotide mature miRNA sequence is excised from the precursor hairpin by the enzyme Dicer. This sequence then associates with RISC which effects RNA interference.

miR-150 functions in hematopoiesis; it regulates genes whose downstream products encourage differentiating stem cells towards becoming megakaryocytes rather than erythrocytes. It is also thought to control B and T cell differentiation, alongside miR-155.

== Role in cancer ==
miR-150 has been linked with a number of cancers. It is thought to promote cancer cell proliferation in gastric cancer and has also been found to be more than 50x overexpressed in osteosarcoma. Moreover, recent studies indicated that miR-150 has an important role in leukemia, specifically in HTLV-1-mediated T-cell transformation.

== Applications ==
miR-150 levels in blood plasma can be indicative of early sepsis; it could have a future use therapeutically in treating the condition. In addition, miR-150 is one of a number of microRNAs whose expression profile could be used as a biomarker of hepatocellular carcinoma.
