= Microprocessor complex =

Protein involved in processing RNA in animal cells

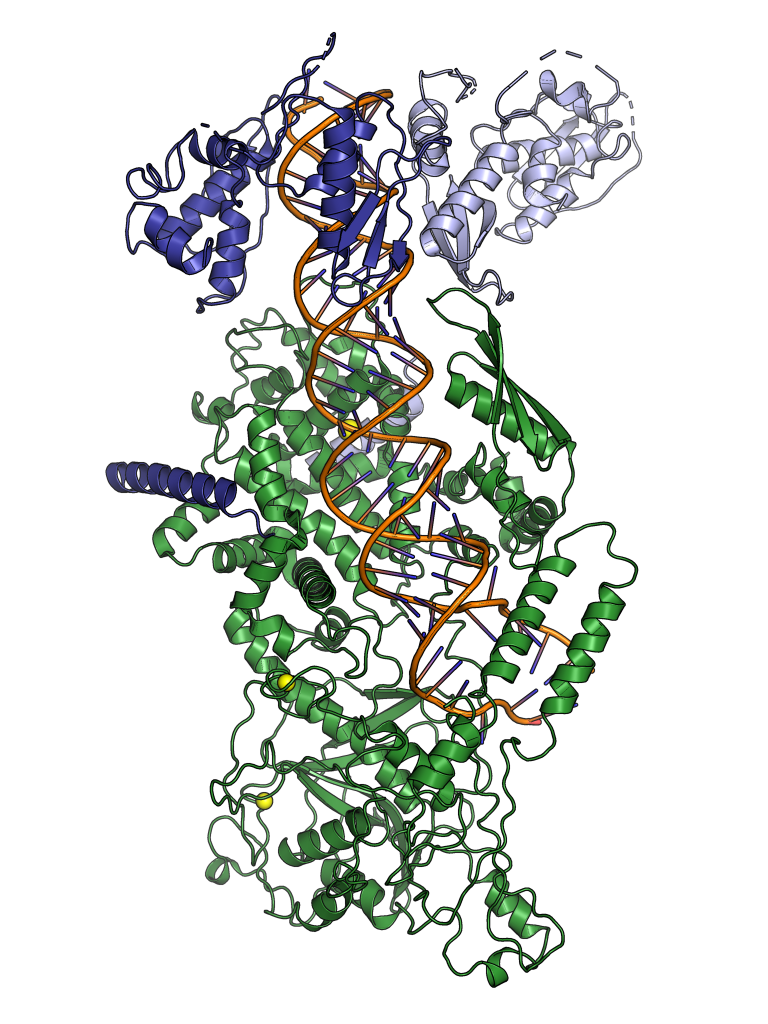
A cryo-electron microscopy structure of the microprocessor complex, showing human Drosha protein (ribonuclease III, green) and two subunits of DGCR8 (dark and light blue) interacting with and ready to cleave a primary microRNA. From PDB: 6V5B.

The microprocessor complex is a protein complex involved in the early stages of processing microRNA (miRNA) and RNA interference (RNAi) in animal cells. The complex is minimally composed of the ribonuclease enzyme Drosha and the dimeric RNA-binding protein DGCR8 (also known as Pasha in non-human animals), and cleaves primary miRNA substrates to pre-miRNA in the cell nucleus. Microprocessor is also the smaller of the two multi-protein complexes that contain human Drosha.

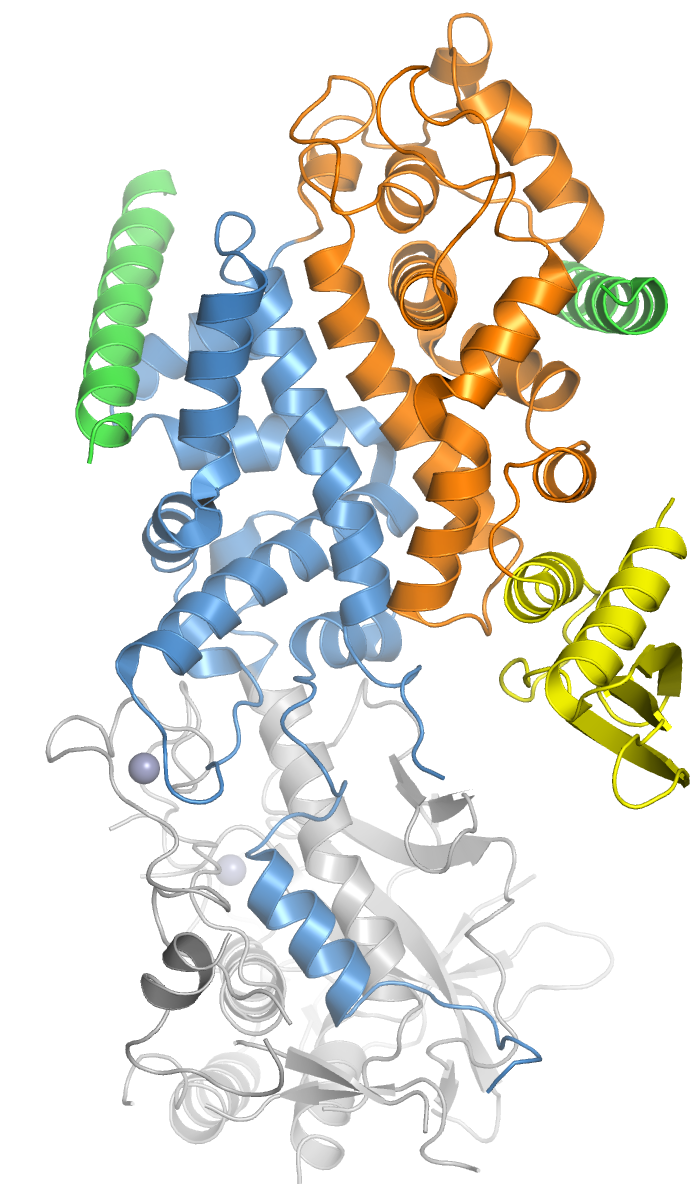
A crystal structure of the human Drosha protein in complex with the C-terminal helices of two DGCR8 molecules (green). Drosha consists of two ribonuclease III domains (blue and orange); a double-stranded RNA binding domain (yellow); and a connector/platform domain (gray) containing two bound zinc ion (spheres). From PDB: 5B16.

== Composition ==
The microprocessor complex consists minimally of two proteins: Drosha, a ribonuclease III enzyme; and DGCR8, a double-stranded RNA binding protein. (DGCR8 is the name used in mammalian genetics, abbreviated from "DiGeorge syndrome critical region 8"; the homologous protein in model organisms such as flies and worms is called Pasha, for Partner of Drosha.) The stoichiometry of the minimal complex was at one point experimentally difficult to determine, but it has been demonstrated to be a heterotrimer of two DGCR8 proteins and one Drosha.

In addition to the minimal catalytically active microprocessor components, other cofactors such as DEAD box RNA helicases and heterogeneous nuclear ribonucleoproteins may be present in the complex to mediate the activity of Drosha. Some miRNAs are processed by microprocessor only in the presence of specific cofactors.

== Function ==
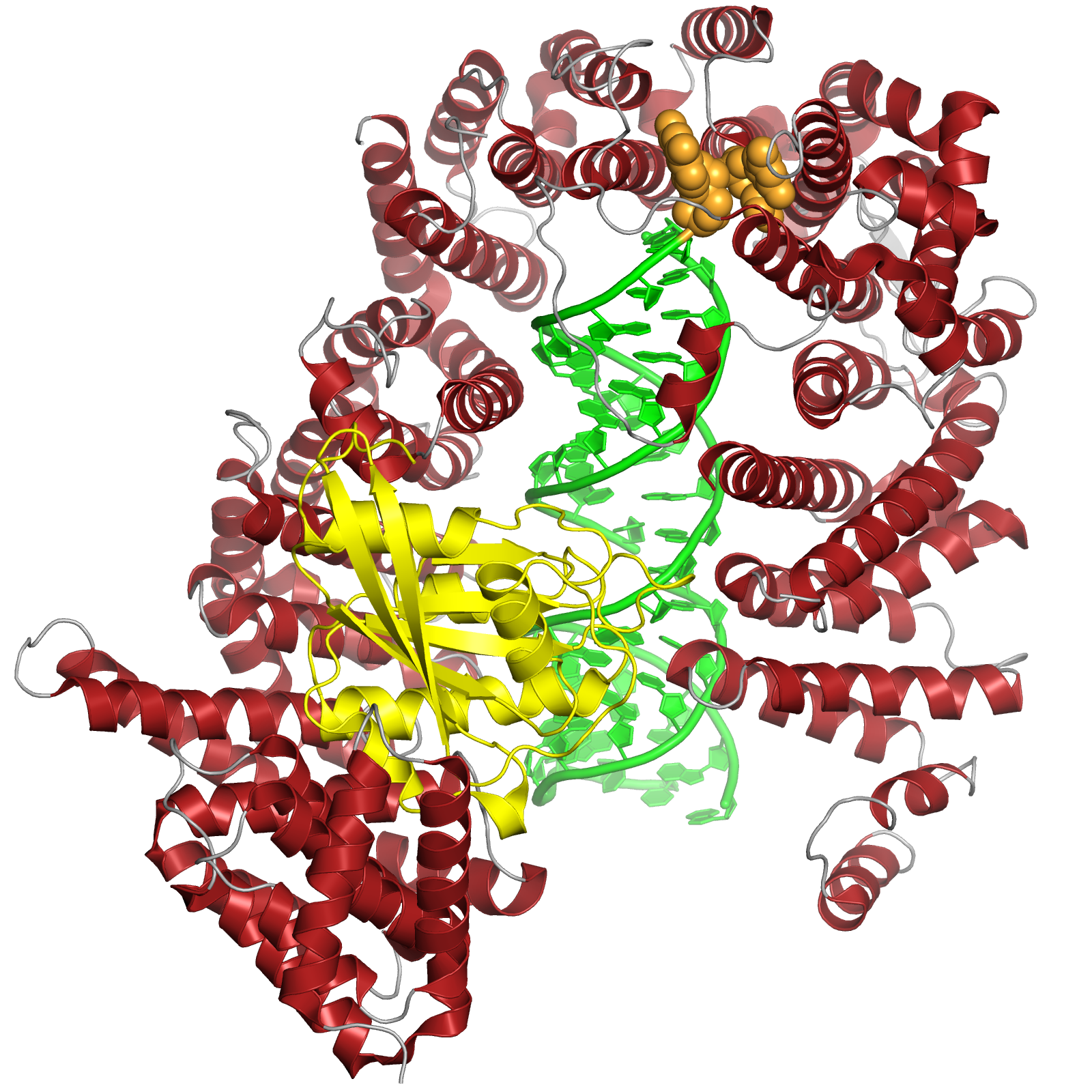
The human exportin-5 protein (red) in complex with Ran-GTP (yellow) and a pre-microRNA (green), showing two-nucleotide overhang recognition element (orange). From PDB: 3A6P.

Located in the cell nucleus, the microprocessor complex cleaves primary miRNA (pri-miRNA) into precursor miRNA (pre-miRNA). Its two subunits have been determined as necessary and sufficient for the mediation of the development of miRNAs from the pri-miRNAs. These molecules of around 70 nucleotides contain a stem-loop or hairpin structure. Pri-miRNA substrates can be derived either from non-coding RNA genes or from introns. In the latter case, there is evidence that the microprocessor complex interacts with the spliceosome and that the pri-miRNA processing occurs prior to splicing.

Microprocessor cleavage of pri-miRNAs typically occurs co-transcriptionally and leaves a characteristic RNase III single-stranded overhang of 2-3 nucleotides, which serves as a recognition element for the transport protein exportin-5. Pre-miRNAs are exported from the nucleus to the cytoplasm in a RanGTP-dependent manner and are further processed, typically by the endoribonuclease enzyme Dicer.

Hemin allows for the increased processing of pri-miRNAs through an induced conformational change of the DGCR8 subunit, and also enhances DGCR8's binding specificity for RNA. DGCR8 recognizes the junctions between hairpin structures and single-stranded RNA and serves to orient Drosha to cleave around 11 nucleotides away from the junctions, and remains in contact with the pri-miRNAs following cleavage and dissociation of Drosha.

Although the large majority of miRNAs undergo processing by microprocessor, a small number of exceptions called mirtrons have been described; these are very small introns which, after splicing, have the appropriate size and stem-loop structure to serve as a pre-miRNA. The processing pathways for microRNA and for exogenously derived small interfering RNA converge at the point of Dicer processing and are largely identical downstream. Broadly defined, both pathways constitute RNAi. Microprocessor is also found to be involved in ribosomal biogenesis specifically in the removal of R-loops and activating transcription of ribosomal protein encoding genes.

== Regulation ==
Gene regulation by miRNA is widespread across many genomes – by some estimates more than 60% of human protein-coding genes are likely to be regulated by miRNA, though the quality of experimental evidence for miRNA-target interactions is often weak. Because processing by microprocessor is a major determinant of miRNA abundance, microprocessor itself is then an important target of regulation.

Both Drosha and DGCR8 are subject to regulation by post-translational modifications modulating stability, intracellular localization, and activity levels. Activity against particular substrates may be regulated by additional protein cofactors interacting with the microprocessor complex. The loop region of the pri-miRNA stem-loop is also a recognition element for regulatory proteins, which may up- or down-regulate microprocessor processing of the specific miRNAs they target.

Microprocessor itself is auto-regulated by negative feedback through association with a pri-miRNA-like hairpin structure found in the DGCR8 mRNA, which when cleaved reduces DGCR8 expression. The structure in this case is located in an exon and is unlikely to itself function as miRNA in its own right.

== Evolution ==
Drosha shares striking structural similarity with the downstream ribonuclease Dicer, suggesting an evolutionary relationship, though Drosha and related enzymes are found only in animals while Dicer relatives are widely distributed, including among protozoans. Both components of the microprocessor complex are conserved among the vast majority of metazoans with known genomes. Mnemiopsis leidyi, a ctenophore, lacks both Drosha and DGCR8 homologs, as well as recognizable miRNAs, and is the only known metazoan with no detectable genomic evidence of Drosha. In plants, the miRNA biogenesis pathway is somewhat different; neither Drosha nor DGCR8 has a homolog in plant cells, where the first step in miRNA processing is usually executed by a different nuclear ribonuclease, DCL1, a homolog of Dicer.

It has been suggested based on phylogenetic analysis that the key components of RNA interference based on exogenous substrates were present in the ancestral eukaryote, likely as an immune mechanism against viruses and transposable elements. Elaboration of this pathway for miRNA-mediated gene regulation is thought to have evolved later.

== Clinical significance ==
The involvement of miRNAs in diseases has led scientists to become more interested in the role of additional protein complexes, like microprocessor, that have the ability to influence or modulate the function and expression of miRNAs. Microprocessor complex component, DGCR8, is affected through the micro-deletion of 22q11.2, a small portion of chromosome 22. This deletion causes irregular processing of miRNAs which leads to DiGeorge Syndrome.
