= Mir-223 =

RNA molecule

mir-223
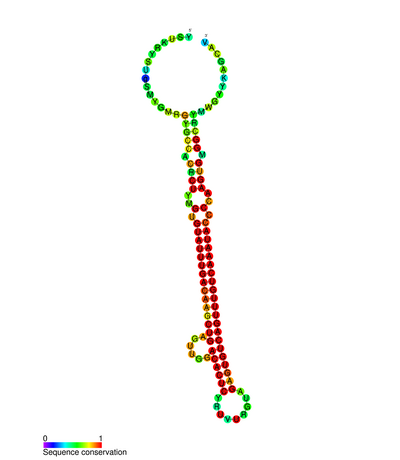
- miR-223 microRNA secondary structure and sequence conservation

Identifiers
- Symbol: mir-223
- Rfam: RF00664
- miRBase family: MIPF0000067
- NCBI Gene: 407008
- HGNC: 31603
- OMIM: 300694

Other data
- RNA type: microRNA
- Domain(s): Eukaryota; Euteleostomi
- PDB structures: PDBe

In molecular biology MicroRNA-223 (miR-223) is a short RNA molecule. MicroRNAs function to regulate the expression levels of other genes by several mechanisms. miR-223 is a hematopoietic specific microRNA with crucial functions in myeloid lineage development. It plays an essential role in promoting granulocytic differentiation while also being associated with the suppression of erythrocytic differentiation. miR-223 is commonly repressed in hepatocellular carcinoma and leukemia. Higher expression levels of miRNA-223 are associated with extranodal marginal-zone lymphoma of mucosa-associated lymphoid tissue of the stomach and recurrent ovarian cancer. In some cancers the microRNA-223 down-regulation is correlated with higher tumor burden, disease aggressiveness, and poor prognostic factors. MicroRNA-223 is also associated with rheumatoid arthritis, fibromyalgia, sepsis, type 2 diabetes, and hepatic ischemia.

== Characterization ==
MicroRNA-223 was initially identified bioinformatically and it was subsequently characterized as part of the haematopoietic system. Its gene resembles a myeloid gene and it could be driven by the PU.1 and C/EBPα proteins which are myeloid transcription factors.

MicroRNA-223 selectively targets distinct populations of transcripts harboring AU-rich elements. More specifically, it was validated that the RhoB mRNA is a bona fide miR-223 target. miR-223 also regulates cyclin E activity by modulating expression of the FBXW7 protein. In particular, overexpression of miR-223 reduces FBXW7 mRNA levels while increasing endogenous cyclin E protein and activity levels.

== Role in hematopoiesis ==
The role of miR-223 in hematopoiesis has been extensively analyzed in the past few years. During granulopoiesis miR-223 acts as fine-tuner of granulocytic differentiation, maturation, and function. More specifically, human granulocytic differentiation is controlled by a regulatory circuitry involving miR-223 and two transcriptional factors, NFIA and C/EBPα. These two factors compete for binding: NFI-A maintains miR-223 at low levels whereas C/EBPα upregulates miR-223 expression. The competition by C/EBPα and the granulocytic differentiation are favored by a negative-feedback loop in which miR-223 represses NFI-A translation.

Analysis of expression profiles indicate that miR-223 expression decreases as cells mature during monocytic, erythroid, and mast cell differentiation. miR-223 down-regulation during erythropoiesis is required for erythrocyte proliferation and differentiation at progenitor and precursor level. This down-modulation promotes erythropoiesis favoring translation of the key functional protein LMO2 resulting in reversible regulation of erythroid and megakaryocytic differentiation.

MicroRNA-223 also plays an essential role during osteoclast differentiation. More specifically, miR-223 expression suppresses the differentiation of osteoclast precursors into osteoclast thus making it a potential viable therapeutic target for a range of bone metabolic disorders with excess osteoclast activity.

== Involvement in disease ==
=== Cancer ===
MicroRNA-223 is commonly repressed in hepatocellular carcinoma, chronic lymphocytic leukemia, acute lymphoblastic leukemia, acute myeloid leukemia, gastric MALT lymphoma, and recurrent ovarian cancer.

Integrative analysis in hepatocellular carcinoma implicates Stathmin 1 (STMN1) as a downstream target of miR-223. Furthermore, miR-223 could suppress the luciferase activity in reporter construct containing the STMN1 3' untranslated region. The reduced expressions of miR-223 may predispose to the development of hepatocellular carcinoma via the widespread induction of chromosomal instability by STMN1.

MicroRNA-223 blocks the translation of E2F1 leading to inhibition of cell-cycle progression followed by myeloid differentiation. In acute myeloid leukemia (AML), miR-223 is down-regulated thus leading to E2F1 overexpression. The overexpressed E2F1 could bind to the miR-223 promoter and in turn lead to a further decrease in miR-223 expression through a negative feedback loop followed by myeloid cell-cycle progression at the expense of differentiation. Overexpression of E2F1 has been shown to be an oncogenic event that predisposes cells to transformation. While there is some indication of the miR-223 role in AML there is still little known about this microRNA function in chronic lymphocytic and acute lymphoblastic leukemia. Nevertheless, MicroRNA-223 expression levels decreased significantly with the progression of these two diseases thus associating miR-223 down-regulation with higher tumor burden, disease aggressiveness, and poor prognostic factors.

Gastric MALT lymphoma and recurrent ovarian cancer are associated with higher levels of MicroRNA-223 expression making them a potential biomarker.

=== Rheumatoid arthritis ===
MicroRNA-223 is overexpressed in the T-lymphocytes cells of rheumatoid arthritis patients suggesting that its expression in this cell type could contribute to the etiology of the disease.

=== Sepsis ===
There is some evidence that MicroRNA-223 and MicroRNA-146a are significantly reduced in septic patients compared with systemic inflammatory response syndrome (SIRS) patients and/or healthy controls. This suggests that miR-223 can be used as a biomarker for distinguishing sepsis from SIRS.

=== Diabetes ===
Quantitative miRNA expression analyses revealed that miR-223 was consistently upregulated in the insulin-resistant hearts of patients with type 2 diabetes. This effect was associated with miR-223 role in Glut4 regulation and glucose metabolism.

=== Hepatic ischemia ===
A recent study concluded that hepatic ischemia/reperfusion injury might be another form of liver disease that is associated with the alteration in miR-223 expression. Correlation analysis revealed that hepatic miR-223 expression levels are significantly positively correlated with the serum markers of hepatic ischemia. Further, prediction assay of miRNA targets mRNA, acyl-CoA synthetase long-chain family member 3, ephrin A1, and ras homolog gene family member B were predicted to be downstream targets of miR-223.

== See also ==
- MicroRNA
- Hepatocellular carcinoma
- Chronic lymphocytic leukemia
- Acute lymphoblastic leukemia
- Acute myeloid leukemia
- gastric MALT lymphoma
- Ovarian cancer
- Rheumatoid arthritis
- Sepsis
- Diabetes
- Hematopoiesis
