= MiR-144 =

Family of microRNA precursors

miR-144
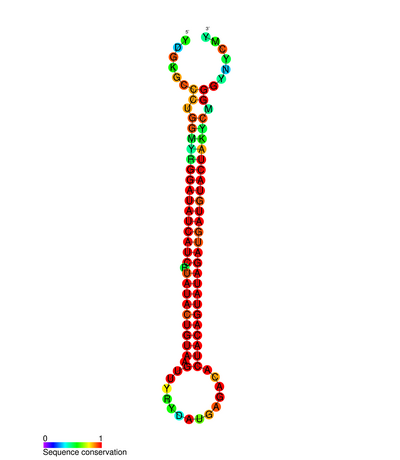
- Conserved secondary structure of miR-144 precursor microRNA

Identifiers
- Symbol: miR-144
- Alt. Symbols: MIR144
- Rfam: RF00682
- miRBase: MI0000460
- miRBase family: MIPF0000093
- NCBI Gene: 406936
- HGNC: 31531
- OMIM: 612070
- RefSeq: NR_029685

Other data
- RNA type: miRNA
- Domain: Mammalia
- GO: 0035195
- SO: 0001244
- Locus: Chr. 17 q11.2
- PDB structures: PDBe

miR-144 is a family of microRNA precursors found in mammals, including humans. The ~22 nucleotide mature miRNA sequence is excised from the precursor hairpin by the enzyme Dicer. In humans, miR-144 has been characterised as a "common miRNA signature" of a number of different tumours.

GATA4 is thought to activate transcription of the miR-144 microRNA precursor.

== Function ==
miR-144 functions in a cluster with miR-451. This locus regulates the expression of a number of genes whose products are involved in erythropoiesis. One of the identified targets of miR-144 is insulin receptor substrate 1.

== Applications ==
miR-144 has been identified as one of a number of potential miRNA targets which could be used to treat schizophrenia and bipolar affective disorder. It has also been suggested as a potential therapeutic tool to treat ischemic heart disease.
