= List of orthotopic procedures =

Orthotopic procedures (from Greek orthos, straight + topos, place) are those occurring at the normal place. Examples include:

- Orthotopic liver transplantation, in which the previous liver is removed and the transplant is placed at that location in the body
- Orthotopic heart transplantation
- Orthotopic kidney transplantation.

When organs are transplanted to a different anatomical location the procedure is said to be heterotopic (e.g. heterotopic heart transplantation).
