= Indolepyruvate ferredoxin oxidoreductase =

indolepyruvate ferredoxin oxidoreductase

Identifiers
- EC no.: 1.2.7.8

Databases
- IntEnz: IntEnz view
- BRENDA: BRENDA entry
- ExPASy: NiceZyme view
- KEGG: KEGG entry
- MetaCyc: metabolic pathway
- PRIAM: profile
- PDB structures: RCSB PDB PDBe PDBsum
- Gene Ontology: AmiGO / QuickGO
Search
- PMC: articles
- PubMed: articles
- NCBI: proteins

In enzymology, indolepyruvate ferredoxin oxidoreductase (EC 1.2.7.8) is an enzyme that catalyzes the chemical reaction

indole-3-pyruvic acid
+ coenzyme A + oxidised ferredoxin
CO_{2}
CO_{2}
R=3-indoyl
+ reduced ferredoxin

The three substrates of this enzyme are indole-3-pyruvic acid, coenzyme A, and oxidized ferredoxin. Its products are S-2-(indol-3-yl)acetyl-CoA, carbon dioxide, and reduced ferredoxin.

This enzyme belongs to the family of oxidoreductases, specifically those acting on the aldehyde or oxo group of donor with an iron-sulfur protein as acceptor. The systematic name of this enzyme class is 3-(indol-3-yl)pyruvate:ferredoxin oxidoreductase (decarboxylating, CoA-indole-acetylating). Other names in common use include 3-(indol-3-yl)pyruvate synthase (ferredoxin), and IOR.
