= Microprocessor complex subunit DGCR8 =

Protein-coding gene in the species Homo sapiens

DGCR8
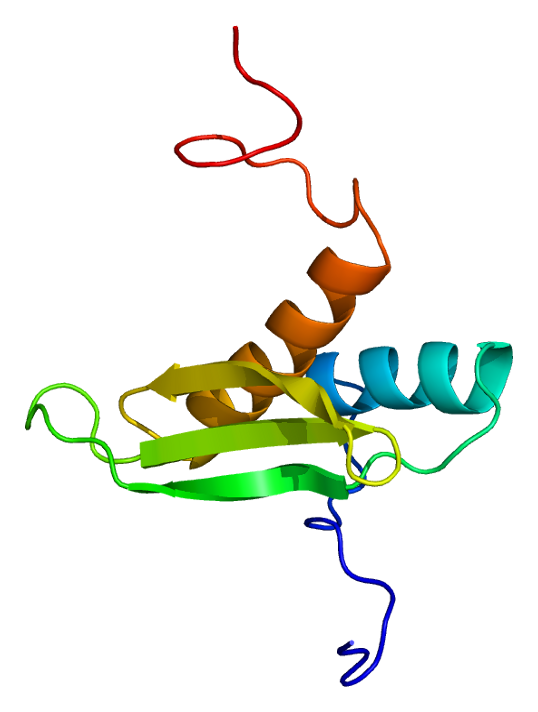

Identifiers
- Aliases: DGCR8, C22orf12, DGCRK6, Gy1, pasha, Pasha, DGCR8 microprocessor complex subunit, microprocessor complex subunit
- External IDs: OMIM: 609030; MGI: 2151114; GeneCards: DGCR8
Available structures
PDB	Ortholog search: PDBe RCSB
PDB	List of PDB id codes 1X47, 2YT4, 3LE4, 5B16

Gene location (Human)
Chr.	Chromosome 22 (human)
Band	22q11.21	Start	20,080,232 bp
Band	22q11.21	End	20,111,877 bp
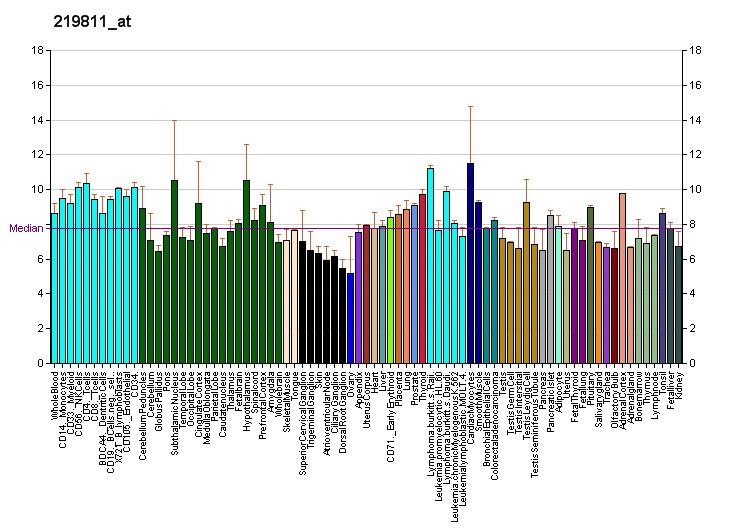

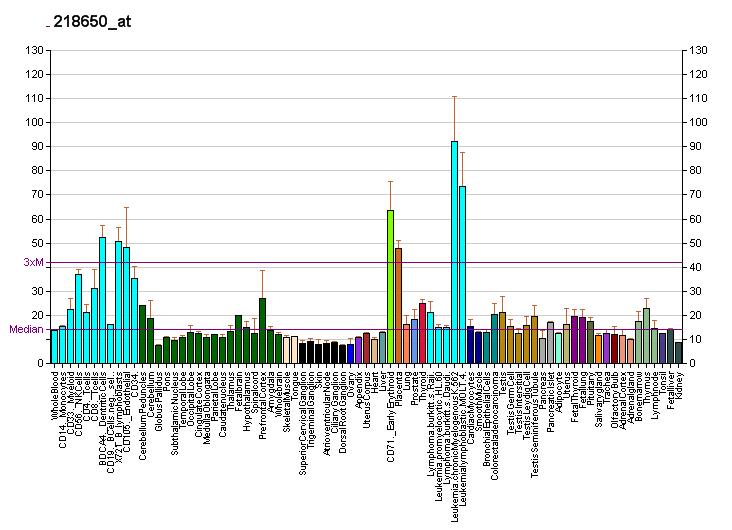

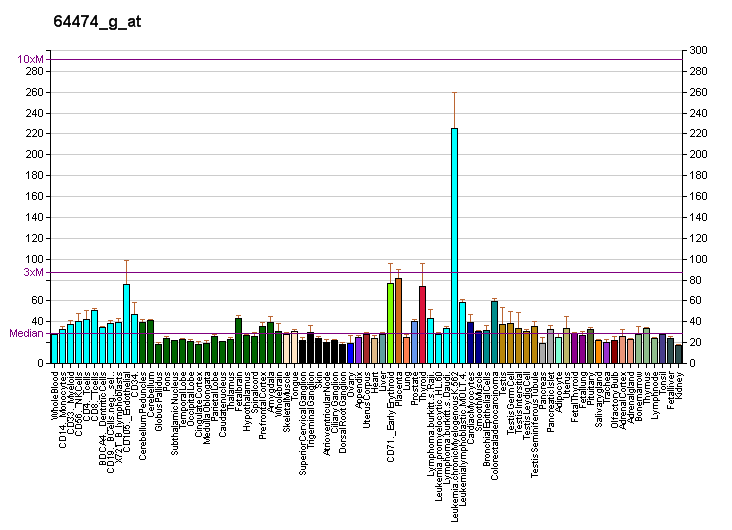
RNA expression pattern
Bgee	Human / Mouse (ortholog); Top expressed in: right hemisphere of cerebellum; sural nerve; right testis; left testis; body of uterus; right ovary; right lobe of thyroid gland; body of pancreas; left ovary; apex of heart / n/a; More reference expression data
BioGPS	More reference expression data
Gene ontology
Molecular function	primary miRNA binding; ribonuclease III activity; double-stranded RNA binding; protein binding; heme binding; protein homodimerization activity; metal ion binding; RNA binding; identical protein binding
Cellular component	cytoplasm; microprocessor complex; nucleolus; nucleus; nucleoplasm; postsynaptic density
Biological process	regulation of stem cell proliferation; primary miRNA processing; RNA phosphodiester bond hydrolysis, endonucleolytic; RNA phosphodiester bond hydrolysis; miRNA metabolic process
Sources:Amigo / QuickGO
Orthologs
Databases	NCBI: entry; OMA: entry
Species	Human	Mouse
Entrez	54487	94223
Ensembl	ENSG00000128191	ENSMUSG00000022718
UniProt	Q8WYQ5	Q9EQM6
RefSeq (mRNA)	NM_001190326; NM_022720	NM_033324
RefSeq (protein)	NP_001177255; NP_073557	NP_201581
Location (UCSC)	Chr 22: 20.08 – 20.11 Mb	n/a
PubMed search
- Wikidata
View/Edit Human	View/Edit Mouse

The microprocessor complex subunit DGCR8 (DiGeorge syndrome critical region 8) is a protein that in humans is encoded by the DGCR8 gene. In other animals, particularly the common model organisms Drosophila melanogaster and Caenorhabditis elegans, the protein is known as Pasha (partner of Drosha). It is a required component of the RNA interference pathway.

== Function ==
The subunit DGCR8 is localized to the cell nucleus and is required for microRNA (miRNA) processing. It binds to the other subunit Drosha, an RNase III enzyme, to form the microprocessor complex that cleaves a primary transcript known as pri-miRNA to a characteristic stem-loop structure known as a pre-miRNA, which is then further processed to miRNA fragments by the enzyme Dicer. DGCR8 contains an RNA-binding domain and is thought to bind pri-miRNA to stabilize it for processing by Drosha.

DGCR8 is also required for some types of DNA repair. Removal of UV-induced DNA photoproducts, during transcription coupled nucleotide excision repair (TC-NER), depends on JNK phosphorylation of DGCR8 on serine 153. While DGCR8 is known to function in microRNA biogenesis, this activity is not required for DGCR8-dependent removal of UV-induced photoproducts. Nucleotide excision repair is also needed for repair of oxidative DNA damage due to hydrogen peroxide (H_{2}O_{2}), and DGCR8 depleted cells are sensitive to H_{2}O_{2}.
