= Calmodulin-regulated spectrin-associated protein 3 =

Microtubule minus-end binding human protein

CAMSAP3

Identifiers
- Aliases: CAMSAP3, KIAA1543, NEZHA, PPP1R80, calmodulin regulated spectrin associated protein family member 3
- External IDs: OMIM: 612685; MGI: 1916947; GeneCards: CAMSAP3
Available structures
| PDB | Ortholog search: PDBe RCSB |
| PDB | List of PDB id codes 1UGJ |

Gene location (Human)
| Chr. | Chromosome 19 (human) |
| Band | 19p13.2 | Start | 7,595,863 bp |
| Band | 19p13.2 | End | 7,618,304 bp |

Gene location (Mouse)
| Chr. | Chromosome 8 (mouse) |
| Band | 8|8 A1.1 | Start | 3,587,293 bp |
| Band | 8|8 A1.1 | End | 3,609,075 bp |
RNA expression pattern
| Bgee | Human / Mouse (ortholog); Top expressed in: skin of abdomen; skin of leg; mucosa of transverse colon; right lobe of liver; body of pancreas; right hemisphere of cerebellum; duodenum; right lobe of thyroid gland; salivary gland; minor salivary glands / Top expressed in: secondary oocyte; lip; primary oocyte; submandibular gland; lacrimal gland; zygote; epiblast; duodenum; zone of skin; epithelium of stomach; More reference expression data |
| BioGPS | n/a |
Gene ontology
| Molecular function | microtubule binding; spectrin binding; calmodulin binding; protein binding; actin filament binding; microtubule minus-end binding |
| Cellular component | cytoplasm; zonula adherens; adherens junction; cell junction; centrosome; microtubule; cytoskeleton; microtubule minus-end |
| Biological process | negative regulation of phosphatase activity; regulation of microtubule cytoskeleton organization; microtubule anchoring; epithelial cell-cell adhesion; neuron projection development; zonula adherens maintenance; regulation of cell migration; regulation of focal adhesion assembly; regulation of Golgi organization; microtubule cytoskeleton organization; embryo development ending in birth or egg hatching; establishment or maintenance of microtubule cytoskeleton polarity; regulation of microtubule polymerization; regulation of organelle organization; establishment of epithelial cell apical/basal polarity; protein transport along microtubule; negative regulation of microtubule depolymerization; cytoplasmic microtubule organization |
Sources:Amigo / QuickGO
Orthologs
| Databases | NCBI: entry; OMA: entry |
| Species | Human | Mouse |
| Entrez | 57662 | 69697 |
| Ensembl | ENSG00000076826 | ENSMUSG00000044433 |
| UniProt | Q9P1Y5 | Q80VC9 |
| RefSeq (mRNA) | NM_001080429; NM_020902 | NM_001163749; NM_027171; NM_001347111; NM_001347112; NM_001347113 |
| RefSeq (protein) | NP_001073898; NP_065953 | NP_001157221; NP_001334040; NP_001334041; NP_001334042; NP_081447 NP_001350168; NP_001350169; NP_001350170; NP_001350171; NP_001350172; NP_001350173; NP_001350174; NP_001350175; NP_001350176; NP_001350177; NP_001350178 |
| Location (UCSC) | Chr 19: 7.6 – 7.62 Mb | Chr 8: 3.59 – 3.61 Mb |
| PubMed search |
- Wikidata
| View/Edit Human | View/Edit Mouse |

Calmodulin-regulated spectrin-associated protein family member 3 (CAMSAP3) is a human protein encoded by the gene CAMSAP3. The protein is commonly referred to as Nezha.

== Function ==
CAMSAP3 acts as a minus-end anchor of microtubules, and binds to them through its CKK domain.

In epithelial cells, it anchors microtubules to the apical cortex, causing them to grow in an apical-to-basal direction. This gives the epithelial cells their rectangular shape.

== In other species ==
In early mouse embryogenesis, the interphase bridge linking sister cells is enriched with CAMSAP3.

== See also ==
- CAMSAP1
- CAMSAP2
