= Calmodulin-regulated spectrin-associated CKK domain =

Protein domain

CAMSAP_CKK
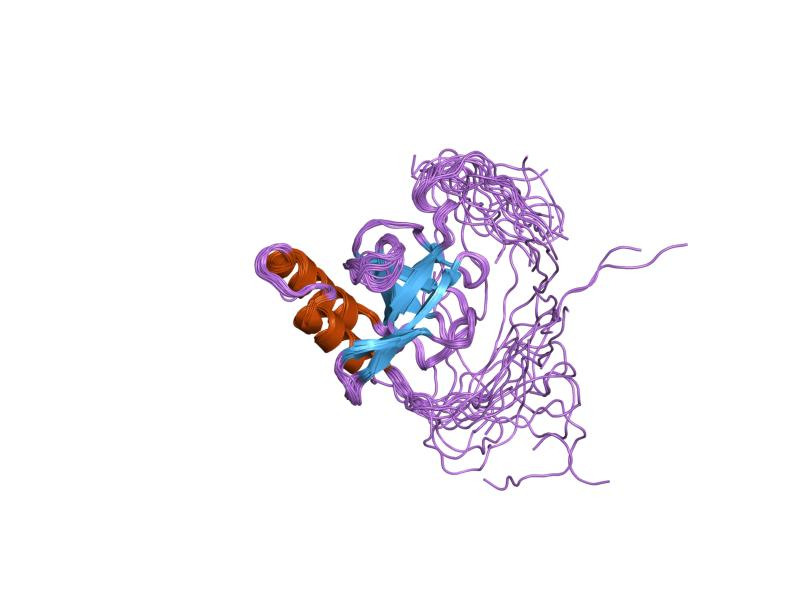
- solution structure of a murine hypothetical protein from riken cdna 2310057j16

Identifiers
- Symbol: CAMSAP_CKK
- Pfam: PF08683
- Pfam clan: CL0350
- InterPro: IPR014797
- SCOP2: 1ugj / SCOPe / SUPFAM
Available protein structures:
- Pfam: structures / ECOD
- PDB: RCSB PDB; PDBe; PDBj
- PDBsum: structure summary

In molecular biology, the calmodulin-regulated spectrin-associated CKK domain (also known as the CKK domain) is a domain which occurs at the C-terminus of a family of eumetazoan proteins collectively defined as calmodulin-regulated spectrin-associated, or CAMSAP, proteins. CAMSAP proteins carry an N-terminal region that includes the CH domain, a central region including a predicted coiled-coil and this C-terminal. This domain is the part of the CAMSAP proteins that binds to microtubules. The domain appears to act by producing inhibition of neurite extension, probably by blocking microtubule function. CKK represents a domain that has evolved with the metazoa. The structure of this domain in murine hypothetical protein has shown the domain to adopt a mainly beta barrel structure with an associated alpha-helical hairpin.
