= Mirtron =

Mirtrons are a type of microRNAs that are located in the introns of the mRNA encoding host genes. These short hairpin introns formed via atypical miRNA biogenesis pathways. Mirtrons arise from the spliced-out introns and are known to function in gene expression.

Mirtrons were first identified in Drosophila melanogaster and Caenorhabditis elegans. The number of mirtrons identified to date are 14, 9, and 19 in D. melanogaster, C. elegans and mammals respectively. Mirtrons are alternative precursors for microRNA biogenesis. The short hairpin introns use splicing to bypass DROSHA cleavage, which is otherwise essential for the generation of canonical animal microRNAs. Mirtrons arise from the spliced-out introns and are known to function like classical microRNAs (miRs) and regulate gene expression, by either mRNA destabilisation, inhibition of the translation or target mRNA cleavage.

Now more evidence is emerging that supports the existence of mirtrons in plants. All the miRNAs in plants are derived from the sequential DCL1 cleavages from pri-miRNA to give pre-miRNA (or miRNA precursor), but the mirtrons bypass the DCL1 cleavage and enter as pre-miRNA in the miRNA maturation pathway.

Mirtrons are distinct from canonical miRNA sequences, and can be distinguished with machine learning methods in data analysis.
