= Ribonuclease III =

Class of enzymes

Ribonuclease III domain
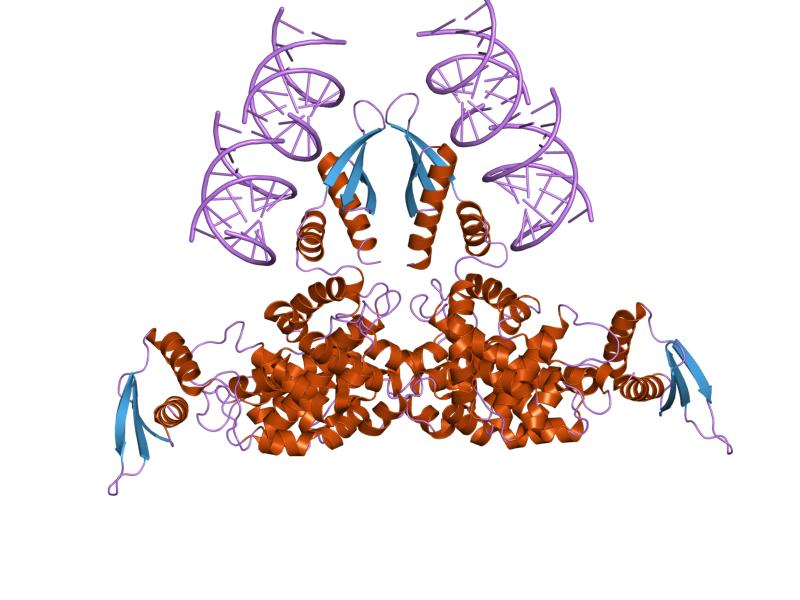
- Ribonuclease III structure interacting with double stranded RNA.

Identifiers
- Symbol: RNase_III
- Pfam: PF00636
- InterPro: IPR000999
- PROSITE: PDOC00448
- SCOP2: 1jfz / SCOPe / SUPFAM
Available protein structures:
- PDB: 1o0wB:51-141 2a11A:41-134 1jfzA:37-121 1rc7A:37-121 1yywA:37-121 1i4sA:37-121 1rc5B:37-121 1yyoA:37-121 1yykB:37-121 1yz9A:37-121 2fflA:333-418 1u61A:10-111 IPR000999 PF00636 (ECOD; PDBsum)
- AlphaFold: IPR000999; PF00636

Ribonuclease III (RNase III or RNase C) (BRENDA 3.1.26.3) is a type of ribonuclease that recognizes dsRNA and cleaves it at specific targeted locations to transform them into mature RNAs. These enzymes are a group of endoribonucleases that are characterized by their ribonuclease domain, which is labelled the RNase III domain. They are ubiquitous compounds in the cell and play a major role in pathways such as RNA precursor synthesis, RNA Silencing, and the pnp autoregulatory mechanism.

== Types of RNase III ==
The RNase III superfamily is divided into four known classes: 1, 2, 3, and 4. Each class is defined by its domain structure.

Class 1 RNase III

- Class 1 RNase III enzymes have a homodimeric structure whose function is to cleave dsRNA into multiple subunits. It is a Mg^{2+}-dependent endonuclease and is largely found in bacteria and bacteriophage. Class 1 RNase III have been found in Glomeromycotan fungi, which was suspected to be the result of horizontal gene transfer from cyanobacteria. Among the RNases III in the class are the rnc from E. coli. Typically, class I enzymes possess a single RNase III domain (RIIID) followed by a dsRNA-binding domain (dsRBD). They process precursors to ribosomal RNA (rRNA), small nuclear RNA (snRNA) and small nucleolar RNA (snoRNA). The basic dsRNA cleavage function of Class 1 RNase III is retained in most of the organisms in which it is present. However, in a number of species the function has changed and taken on different or additional biological roles.

Rnc (UniProtKB P0A7Y0) - E. coli - this RNase III is involved in the processing of viral transcripts and some mRNAs through the cleavage of multiple areas on the dsRNA. This cleavage can be influenced by ribosomal protein presence.

The variances of Class 1 RNase III, called Mini-III, are homodimeric enzymes and consist solely of the RNase III domains.

Class 2 RNase III

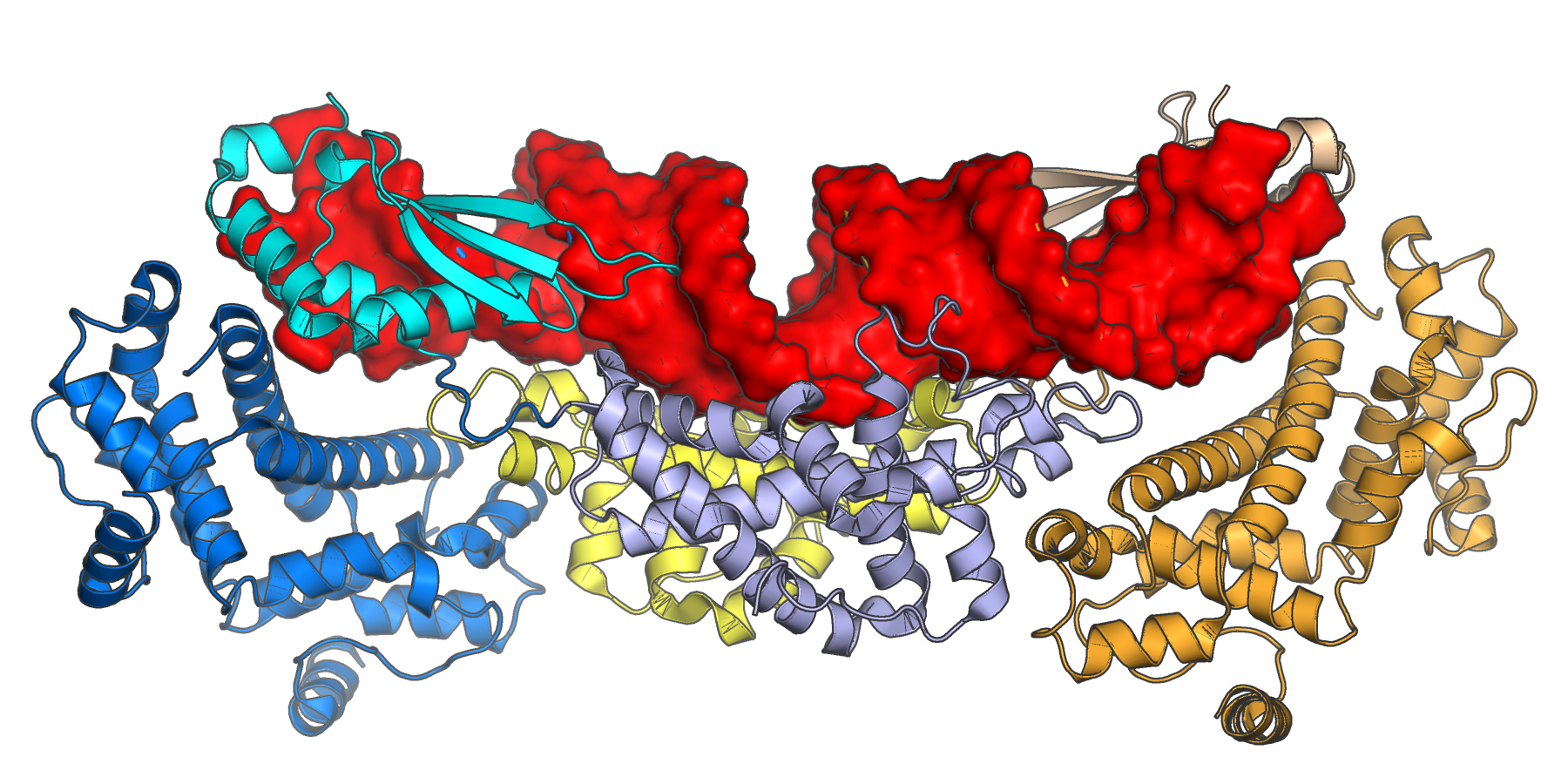
Class 2 ribonuclease III (Rnt1p) from Saccharomyces cerevisiae in complex with double-stranded RNA

- Class II is defined by the presence of an N-terminal domain (NTD), a RIIID, and a dsRBD. Class II is found in some fungi species. They process precursors to rRNA, snRNA, and snoRNA.

Yeast nucleases with the Class 2 RNase III domain:

RNT1 (UniProtKB Q02555) - S. cerevisiae - this RNase III is involved in the transcription and processing of rDNA, the 3' end formation of U2 snRNA via cleavage of the terminal loop, cell wall stress response and degradation, and regulation of morphogenesis checkpoint genes.

Pac1 (UniProtKB P22192) - S. pombe - this RNase III is located on chromosome II of the yeast genome and, when over expressed, is directly involved in the sterility, lack of mating efficiency, abnormal mitotic cell cycle, and mutation suppression of the organism.

Class 3 RNase III

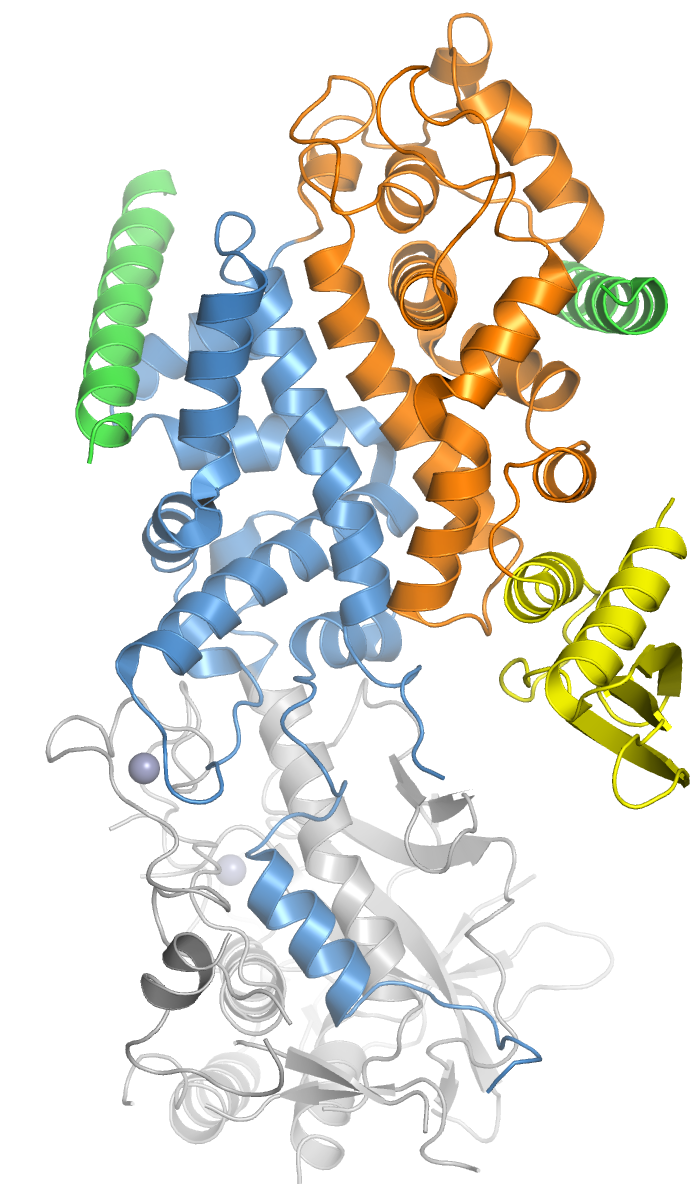
The crystal structure of the human Drosha ribonuclease enzyme in complex with two C-terminal helices of the DGCR8 protein.

- Class 3 RNases III include the Drosha family of enzymes known to function in maturation of precursors to microRNA (miRNA).

Class 4 RNase III

- Class 4 RNases III include the Dicer family of enzymes known to function in RNA interference (RNAi). Class 4 III RNases are S-RNase components. It is a component of the self-incompatibility system in Rosaceae, Solanaceae, and Plantaginaceae. They are recruited to cope with various environmental stress scenarios.
- Dicer enzymes process dsRNA substrates into small RNA fragments of individual size ranging from 21-27 nucleotides in length. Dicer has an N-terminal helicase/ATPase domain which is followed by another domain of an unknown function. It also comprises the centrally positioned PAZ domain and a C-terminal configuration which includes one dsRBD and two RNase III catalytic domains. Interactions of Dicer occurs with other proteins, which includes TRBP, PACT, and Ago2. RNAs that are produced by Dicer act as guides for a sequence of particular silencing of cognate genes through RNAi and related pathways.

== Human proteins containing RNase III domain ==
- DICER1
- DROSHA

== See also ==
- RncO
