= Drosha =

Ribonuclease III enzyme

DROSHA
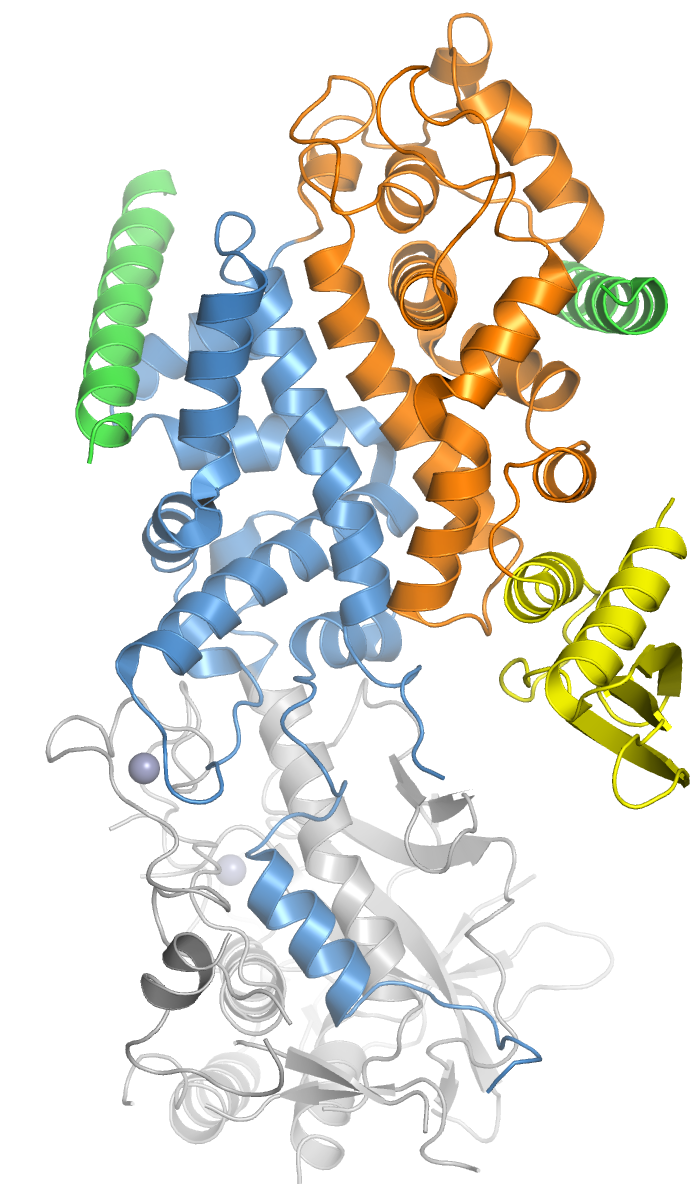
- Crystal structure of Drosha and DGCR8, which form the core of the microprocessor complex.

Identifiers
- Aliases: DROSHA, ETOHI2, HSA242976, RANSE3L, RN3, RNASE3L, RNASEN, drosha ribonuclease III
- External IDs: OMIM: 608828; MGI: 1261425; GeneCards: DROSHA
Available structures
PDB	Ortholog search: PDBe RCSB
PDB	List of PDB id codes 2KHX, 5B16
Enzyme activity
EC #	BRENDA	ExPASy	KEGG	MetaCyc
3.1.26.3	↗	↗	↗	↗

Gene location (Human)
Chr.	Chromosome 5 (human)
Band	5p13.3	Start	31,400,494 bp
Band	5p13.3	End	31,532,196 bp

Gene location (Mouse)
Chr.	Chromosome 15 (mouse)
Band	15|15 A1	Start	12,824,901 bp
Band	15|15 A1	End	12,935,377 bp
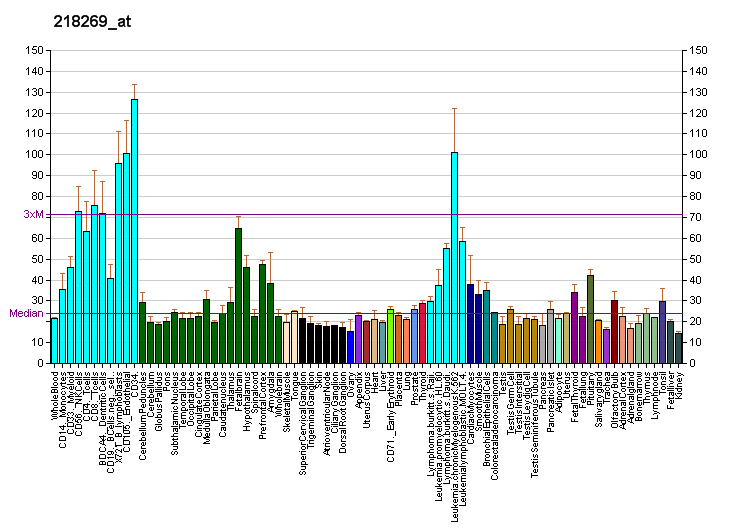
RNA expression pattern
Bgee	Human / Mouse (ortholog); Top expressed in: endothelial cell; ventricular zone; germinal epithelium; Brodmann area 23; right hemisphere of cerebellum; ganglionic eminence; middle temporal gyrus; sural nerve; epithelium of colon; anterior pituitary / Top expressed in: primitive streak; Paneth cell; otolith organ; fossa; utricle; condyle; substantia nigra; Rostral migratory stream; aortic valve; ascending aorta; More reference expression data
BioGPS	More reference expression data
Gene ontology
Molecular function	ribonuclease III activity; protein homodimerization activity; lipopolysaccharide binding; metal ion binding; endoribonuclease activity; protein binding; nuclease activity; endonuclease activity; hydrolase activity; RNA binding; DEAD/H-box RNA helicase binding; SMAD binding; R-SMAD binding; primary miRNA binding; double-stranded RNA binding
Cellular component	nucleoplasm; microprocessor complex; nucleolus; nucleus; plasma membrane; focal adhesion; postsynaptic density
Biological process	RNA processing; ribosome biogenesis; nucleic acid phosphodiester bond hydrolysis; rRNA catabolic process; positive regulation of gene expression; defense response to Gram-negative bacterium; regulation of miRNA metabolic process; primary miRNA processing; regulation of gene expression; defense response to Gram-positive bacterium; RNA phosphodiester bond hydrolysis, endonucleolytic; regulation of regulatory T cell differentiation; RNA phosphodiester bond hydrolysis; regulation of inflammatory response; miRNA metabolic process; gene silencing; production of siRNA involved in RNA interference; pre-miRNA processing
Sources:Amigo / QuickGO
Orthologs
Databases	NCBI: entry; OMA: entry
Species	Human	Mouse
Entrez	29102	14000
Ensembl	ENSG00000113360	ENSMUSG00000022191
UniProt	Q9NRR4	Q5HZJ0
RefSeq (mRNA)	NM_001100412; NM_013235; NM_001382508	NM_001130149; NM_026799
RefSeq (protein)	NP_001093882; NP_037367; NP_001369437	NP_001123621; NP_081075
Location (UCSC)	Chr 5: 31.4 – 31.53 Mb	Chr 15: 12.82 – 12.94 Mb
PubMed search
- Wikidata
View/Edit Human	View/Edit Mouse

Drosha is a Class 2 ribonuclease III enzyme that in humans is encoded by the DROSHA (formerly RNASEN) gene. It is the primary nuclease that executes the initiation step of miRNA processing in the nucleus. It works closely with DGCR8 and in correlation with Dicer. It has been found significant in clinical knowledge for cancer prognosis and HIV-1 replication.

== History ==
Human Drosha was cloned in 2000 when it was identified as a nuclear dsRNA ribonuclease involved in the processing of ribosomal RNA precursors. The other two human enzymes that participate in the processing and activity of miRNA are the Dicer and Argonaute proteins. Recently, Drosha has been associated with cancer and childhood acute lymphoblastic leukemia prognosis, and HIV-1 replication.

== Function ==
Members of the ribonuclease III superfamily of double-stranded (ds) RNA-specific endoribonucleases participate in diverse RNA maturation and decay pathways in eukaryotic and prokaryotic cells. The RNase III Drosha is the core nuclease that executes the initiation step of microRNA (miRNA) processing in the nucleus.

The microRNAs thus generated are short RNA molecules that regulate a wide variety of other genes by interacting with the RNA-induced silencing complex (RISC) to induce cleavage of complementary messenger RNA (mRNA) as part of the RNA interference pathway. MicroRNA molecules are synthesized as long RNA primary transcripts known as a pri-miRNAs, which are cleaved by Drosha to produce a characteristic stem-loop structure of about 70 base pairs long, known as a pre-miRNA. Pre-miRNAs, when associated with EXP5, are stabilized due to removal of the 5' cap and 3' poly(A) tail. Drosha exists as part of a protein complex called the Microprocessor complex, which also contains the double-stranded RNA binding protein DGCR8 (called Pasha in D. melanogaster and C. elegans). DGCR8 is essential for Drosha activity and is capable of binding single-stranded fragments of the pri-miRNA that are required for proper processing. The Drosha complex also contains several auxiliary factors such as EWSR1, FUS, hnRNPs, p68, and p72.

Both Drosha and DGCR8 are localized to the cell nucleus, where processing of pri-miRNA to pre-miRNA occurs. These two proteins homeostatically control miRNA biogenesis by an auto-feedback loop. A 2nt 3' overhang is generated by Drosha in the nucleus recognized by Dicer in the cytoplasm, which couples the upstream and downstream processing events. Pre-miRNA is then further processed by the RNase Dicer into mature miRNAs in the cell cytoplasm. There also exists an isoform of Drosha that does not contain a nuclear localization signal, which results in the generation of c-Drosha. This variant has been shown to localize to the cell cytoplasm rather than the nucleus, but the effects on pri-miRNA processing are yet unclear.

Both Drosha and Dicer also participate in the DNA damage response.

Certain miRNAs have been found to deviate from conventional biogenesis pathways and do not necessarily require Drosha or Dicer, which is because they do not require the processing of pri-miRNA to pre-miRNA. Drosha-independent miRNAs derive from mirtrons, which are genes that encode for miRNAs in their introns and make use of splicing to bypass Drosha cleavage. Simtrons are mirtron-like, splicing-independent, and do require Drosha mediated cleavage, although they do not require most proteins in the canonical pathway such as DGCR8 or Dicer.

== Clinical significance ==
Drosha and other miRNA processing enzymes may be important in cancer prognosis. Both Drosha and Dicer can function as master regulators of miRNA processing and have been observed to be down-regulated in some types of breast cancer. The alternative splicing patterns of Drosha in The Cancer Genome Atlas have also indicated that c-drosha appears to be enriched in various types of breast cancer, colon cancer, and esophageal cancer. However, the exact nature of the association between microRNA processing and tumorigenesis is unclear, but its function can be effectively examined by siRNA knockdown based on an independent validation.

Drosha and other miRNA processing enzymes may also be important in HIV-1 replication. miRNAs contribute to the innate antiviral defense. This can be shown by the knockdown of two important miRNA processing proteins, Drosha and Dicer, which leads to a significant enhancement of viral replication in PBMCs from HIV-1-infected patients. Thus, Drosha, in conjunction with Dicer, seem to have a role in controlling HIV-1 replication.
