= MAGEL2 =

Protein-coding gene in the species Homo sapiens

Identifiers
- Aliases: MAGEL2, NDNL1, PWLS, nM15, SHFYNG, MAGE family member L2
- External IDs: OMIM: 605283; MGI: 1351648; GeneCards: MAGEL2

Gene location (Human)
Chr.	Chromosome 15 (human)
Band	15q11.2	Start	23,643,549 bp
Band	15q11.2	End	23,647,867 bp

Gene location (Mouse)
Chr.	Chromosome 7 (mouse)
Band	7 C|7 34.37 cM	Start	62,026,758 bp
Band	7 C|7 34.37 cM	End	62,031,388 bp
RNA expression pattern
Bgee	Human / Mouse (ortholog); Top expressed in: gonad; testicle; hypothalamus; Brodmann area 23; middle temporal gyrus; tibia; pituitary gland; anterior pituitary; islet of Langerhans; nucleus accumbens / Top expressed in: arcuate nucleus; median eminence; ventromedial nucleus; suprachiasmatic nucleus; dorsomedial hypothalamic nucleus; paraventricular nucleus of hypothalamus; supraoptic nucleus; nucleus of stria terminalis; labioscrotal swelling; tongue; More reference expression data
BioGPS	n/a
Gene ontology
Molecular function	protein binding; ubiquitin-protein transferase activity
Cellular component	cytoplasm; retromer complex; endosome; early endosome; nucleus; cytosol
Biological process	protein K63-linked ubiquitination; retrograde transport, endosome to Golgi; negative regulation of transcription, DNA-templated; regulation of transcription, DNA-templated; regulation of circadian rhythm; transcription, DNA-templated; positive regulation of actin nucleation; rhythmic process; Arp2/3 complex-mediated actin nucleation
Sources:Amigo / QuickGO
Orthologs
Databases	NCBI: entry; OMA: entry
Species	Human	Mouse
Entrez	54551	27385
Ensembl	ENSG00000254585	ENSMUSG00000056972
UniProt	Q9UJ55	Q9QZ04
RefSeq (mRNA)	NM_019066	NM_013779
RefSeq (protein)	NP_061939	NP_038807
Location (UCSC)	Chr 15: 23.64 – 23.65 Mb	Chr 7: 62.03 – 62.03 Mb
PubMed search
- Wikidata
View/Edit Human	View/Edit Mouse

MAGE family member L2 (MAGEL2) is a protein that in human is encoded by the MAGEL2 gene. This protein is a ubuquitin ligase enhancer which is necessary for endsomal protein recycling. This protein is a part of MUST complex (which consists of MAGEL2-USP7-TRIM27 complex).

== Gene ==
The MAGEL2 gene is located on the long(q) arm of chromosome 15 on position 11.2, from base pair 23,643,549 to base pair 23,647,867. This gene is expressed from the paternal chromosome 15.

== Function ==
This protein is known to regulate AMPA receptors in hypothalamus. Also it can regualte secretion of hormones such as: oxytocin, arginine vasopressin, somatostatin, TSH, somatotropin, LH. Loss of that protein showed decreased neuoronal activity in hypothalamus and hippocampus of mice via AMPA receptor trafficking defects, consequently neuronal activity gets disrupted and synaptic excitation/inhibition balance is lost.

MAGEL2 is required for balance of serotonin, dopamine and noradrenaline concentrations, in Magel2-null mice concentrations of that neurotransmitters had been decreased.

As mentioned above MAGEL2 participates in MUST complex, which promotes endosomal F-actin polymerization.

== Clinical significance ==
=== Prader-willi syndrome ===
Prader-Willi syndrome (PWS) is a rare genetic disorder that is caused by maternal UPD(15) or deletions/epimutations on paternal chromosome 15. PWS can cause variety of symptoms from hypotoniain infancy to behavioural problems in early childhood. Some symptoms can be found in infants aside from hypotonia, are a poor eye coordination, almond-shaped eyes, thin upper lip, also, due to hypotonia, problems with sucking reflex. Their cries are weak and they have difficulty of waking up.

Deletion of MAGEL2 (and other genes that are located on the same region) contributes to symptoms in PWS.

=== Schaaf-Yang syndrome ===
Schaaf-Yang syndrome (SYS) is a rare genetic disorder that is caused by a mutation in a paternally expressed gene MAGEL2. The signs of this disease are: hypotonia, developmental delay and contractures of joints, also another signs of that disease are unique facial features, small hands, problems with eye and short stature.

As mentioned above, SYS is caused by LoF variants of the paternal copy of MAGEL2.
