= Schaaf–Yang syndrome =

Human genetic disorder

- Other names: Prader–Willi–like syndrome (PWLS), Chitayat–Hall syndrome
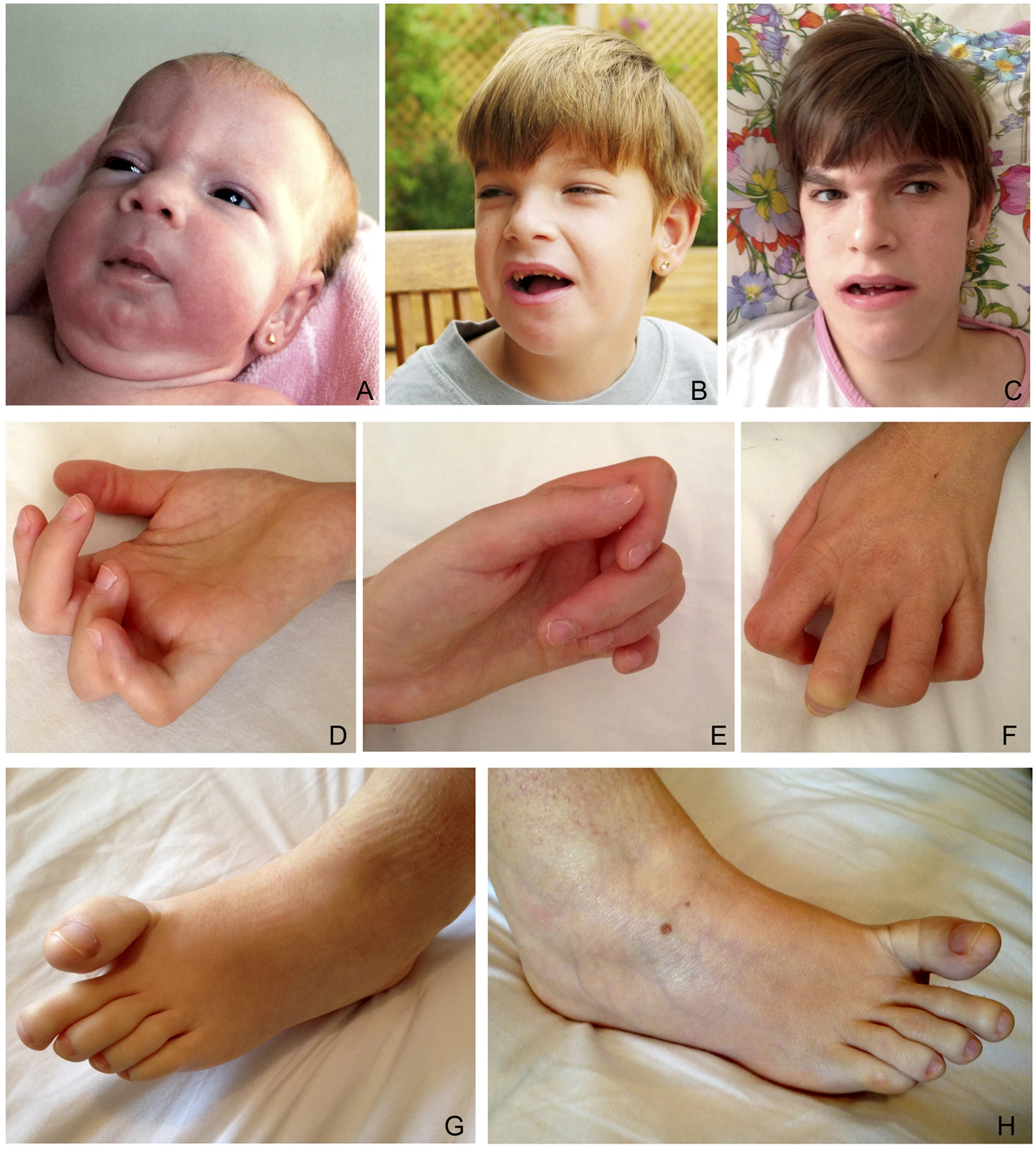
- Person showing facial features of SYS, such as: Trigonocephaly and tooth malposition. Also limb contractures can be seen.
- Specialty: Neurology, Medical genetics, Endocrinology
- Symptoms: Facial shape abnormality, undescended testes, feeding problems, hypotonia, flexion contracture, global developmental delay
- Causes: Genetic mutations
- Diagnostic method: Genetic testing
- Prognosis: Reduced life expectancy. Fetuses are demised due to fetal akinesia
- Prevalence: <1 in 1,000,000

Schaaf–Yang syndrome (SYS) is a rare genetic disorder that is caused by a heterozygous mutation in a paternal-expressed gene MAGEL2. Main signs of this disorder are: intellectual disability/developmental delay, autism spectrum disorder, hypogonadism, hypotonia in infancy with feeding problems, and distal arthrogryposis. Facial features are included short noses, dense eyebrows, and protruding jaw.

== Signs and symptoms ==
Symptoms of this disease are:

Very frequent

- Facial shape abnormality
- Undescended testis
- Feeding problems
- Hypotonia
- Flexion contracture
- Neurodevelopmental delay

Frequent

- Visceral obesity
- Temper tantrums
- Lack of pubertal development
- Autistic behavior
- Chronic constipation
- External genital hypoplasia
- Borderline/Mild Intellectual disability
- Kyphosis
- Scoliosis
- Sleep apnea
- Temperature regulation problems
- Failure to thrive
- Gastroesophageal reflux disease
- Hypogonadism
- Enlargement of cerebral ventricles

Occasional

- Almond-shaped eyes
- Atrial septal defect
- Hypothyroidism
- Central sleep apnea
- Downturned corners of mouth
- Thin nasal bridge
- Thin upper lip
- Seizure
- Abnormal dryness of the mouth
- Type 2 diabetes

== Cause ==
The cause of this disease are mutation in a gene MAGEL2 which is located on chromosome 15 (15q11.2) and that gene is expressed from paternal chromosome 15 and methylated on maternal chromosome 15. The MAGEL2 is a part of regulatory complex MUST, which consist of MAGEL2-USP7-TRIM27. This complex regulates WASH complex which function is to promotes endosomal actin polymerization. 50% of people with SYS inherited mutation from their father and remainder are de novo mutation (which means that mutation is new and none of the parents have it).

MAGEL2-regulated WASH complex is important for the regulated secretion in the hypothalamus. MAGEL2 mutation causes decreased secretion of hormones, such as: oxytocin, AVP, somatostatin, thyrotropin-releasing hormone, growth hormone, and luteinizing hormone. Loss of that protein also showed neuronal activity loss in the hypothalamus and hippocampus of mice by disruptions of neuronal activity and changes in the synaptic excitation/inhibition balance through AMPA receptor trafficking defects.

== Diagnosis ==
SYS can be suspected by symptoms and subsequently can be diagnosed by genetic testing.

== Treatment ==
SYS doesn't have a cure. Although symptomatic management is available, It might be effective but it still doesn't alleviate overall impact of SYS, which leaves caregivers unsatisfied.

== Prognosis ==
Life expectancy of person with SYS can be reduced due to fatal complication. Survival into adulthood is possible and oldest patient with SYS is 36 years olds (at the time of article's publication).

== History ==
The first mention of SYS-like symptoms was described by Chitayat et al. (1990). Although the name was coined by Christian P Schaaf and Yaping Yang, who described SYS in details in 2013.

== Prevalence ==
The prevalence of SYS is < 1/1,000,000. Currently, it is estimated that about 250 people are diagnosed with SYS.
