= FHAD1 =

Protein found in humans

Identifiers
- Aliases: FHAD1, forkhead associated phosphopeptide binding domain 1, Forkhead-associated domain containing protein 1 (FHAD1)
- External IDs: MGI: 1920323; GeneCards: FHAD1

Gene location (Human)
Chr.	Chromosome 1 (human)
Band	1p36.21	Start	15,236,521 bp
Band	1p36.21	End	15,400,283 bp

Gene location (Mouse)
Chr.	Chromosome 4 (mouse)
Band	4|4 E1	Start	141,890,438 bp
Band	4|4 E1	End	142,015,082 bp
RNA expression pattern
Bgee	Human / Mouse (ortholog); Top expressed in: right uterine tube; bronchial epithelial cell; olfactory zone of nasal mucosa; left testis; right testis; testicle; mucosa of paranasal sinus; buccal mucosa cell; gonad; right lung / Top expressed in: testicle; spermatid; spermatocyte; vasculature of organ; choroid plexus; hypothalamus; choroid plexus of lateral ventricle; islet of Langerhans; anterior horn of spinal cord; lung; More reference expression data
BioGPS	n/a
Orthologs
Databases	NCBI: entry; OMA: entry
Species	Human	Mouse
Entrez	114827	329977
Ensembl	ENSG00000142621	ENSMUSG00000051435
UniProt	B1AJZ9; H0YE38	A6PWD2
RefSeq (mRNA)	NM_052929; NM_001387888; NM_001391921; NM_001391957	NM_028429; NM_177868
RefSeq (protein)	NP_443161	NP_808536
Location (UCSC)	Chr 1: 15.24 – 15.4 Mb	Chr 4: 141.89 – 142.02 Mb
PubMed search
- Wikidata
View/Edit Human	View/Edit Mouse

Forkhead-associated domain containing protein 1 (FHAD1) is a protein encoded by the FHAD1 gene.

As the name suggests, it has a forkhead-associated domain and an extensive coiled coil structure. It is predicted to have a function related to DNA transcription. It is localized to the nucleus and has a nuclear localization signal.

== Gene ==
=== Locus and size ===
In humans, the FHAD1 gene is located on chromosome 1 (1p36.21) and the genomic sequence is on the plus strand starting from 15236559 bp and ending at 15400283 bp. There are 3 main genes around FHAD1, out of which 2 encode proteins with known functions. Two genes, EFHD2 and Chymotrypsin-C (CTRC) lie downstream of FHAD1 on the plus strand. TMEM51 lies upstream of FHAD1.

FHAD1 is 163,682 bases long and contains 43 exons.

=== Common aliases ===
FHAD1 has 4 aliases, Forkhead associated phosphopeptide binding domain 1, Forkhead-associated (FHA) phosphopeptide binding domain 1, FHA Domain-Containing Protein 1, and KIAA1937.

== mRNA ==
The mRNA transcript of FHAD1 5138 bp long. The gene has 30 isoforms based on NCBI gene data.

== Protein ==
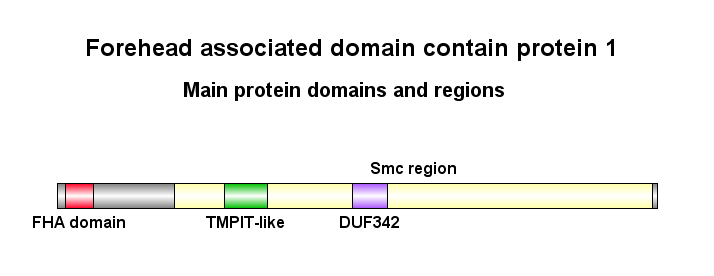

The FHAD 1 protein is 1412 aa long, weighs 16.2 kDa and has an isoelectric point of 6.52. It has 3 isoforms, namely 1, 3 and 4, but only isoform 1 is supported by experimental evidence. It consists of 1 glutamic acid rich region and 1 proline rich region.

=== Domains and motifs ===
==== Forehead-associated domain ====
The FHA domain extends from 18–84 aa in the protein. It can recognize and bind to phosphorylation sites, specifically pSer, pThr and pTyr. The exact mechanism and function of this domain still being studied, but it is found in proteins performing many different functions, mainly DNA repair and transduction.

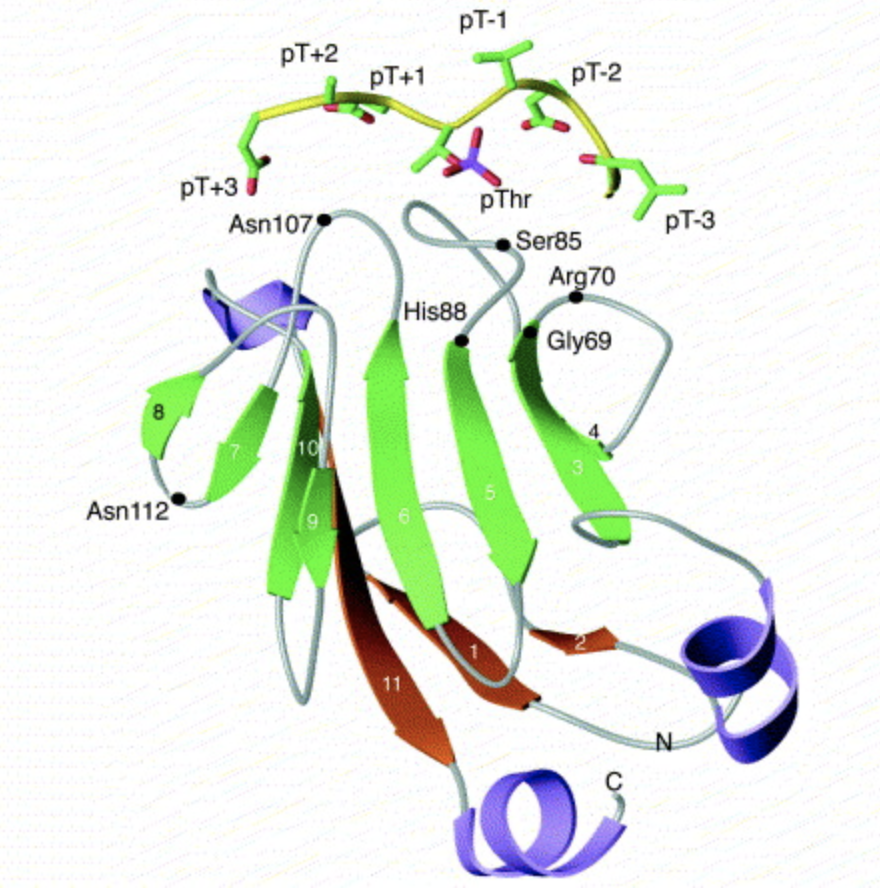
Structure of the forkhead-associated domain

==== Smc region ====
FHAD1 contains one Smc (Structural maintenance of chromosomes) region from 275–1401 aa. This region encodes Smc proteins that are involved in cell cycle control, cell division and chromosome separation.

==== Tmpit-like protein, pfam07851 ====
This region extends from 394–494 aa in FHAD1. The proteins encoded by the TMPIT proteins are predicted to be transmembrane proteins. However, there is lack of literature to support this.

==== DUF342 ====
This domain extends from 694–777 aa in FHAD1. It encodes a protein from a family of bacterial proteins with no known function.

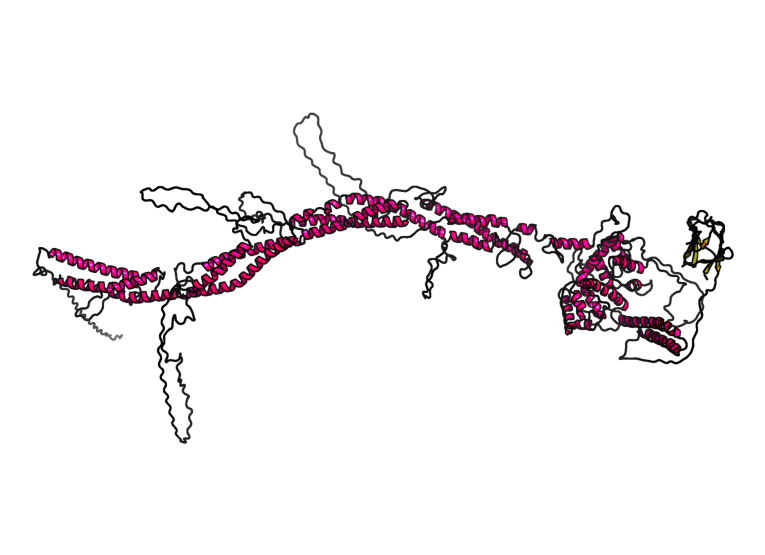
Predicted structure of FHAD1 using RaptorX software

=== Structure ===
FHAD1 contains the forkhead-associated domain that consists of beta sheets. Based on structure prediction software, the rest of the protein consists of alpha helices and random coils. Overall, FHAD1 has a coiled coil structure as shown in the figure.

=== Post-translational modifications ===
FHAD1 is predicted to undergo multiple different types of post-translational modifications based on prediction software.

- Glycosylation: There were 101 possible glycosylation sites on FHAD1 and consisted mainly of amino acids involved in O-linked glycosylation.
- Phosphorylation: The protein was predicted to have a large number of phosphorylation sites, at least more than 100.
- Glycation: Multiple lysine residues of FHAD1 were predicted for glycation of their ε amino groups.
- SUMOylation: 4 SUMOylation consensus sequences and 3 interaction sites were predicted on FHAD1.
- O-GlcNAc sites: 6 sites for O-GlcNAc glycosylation were predicted on FHAD1. Research has shown that this specific type of glycosylation is most abundant in nucleocytoplasmic proteins.

=== Subcellular localization ===
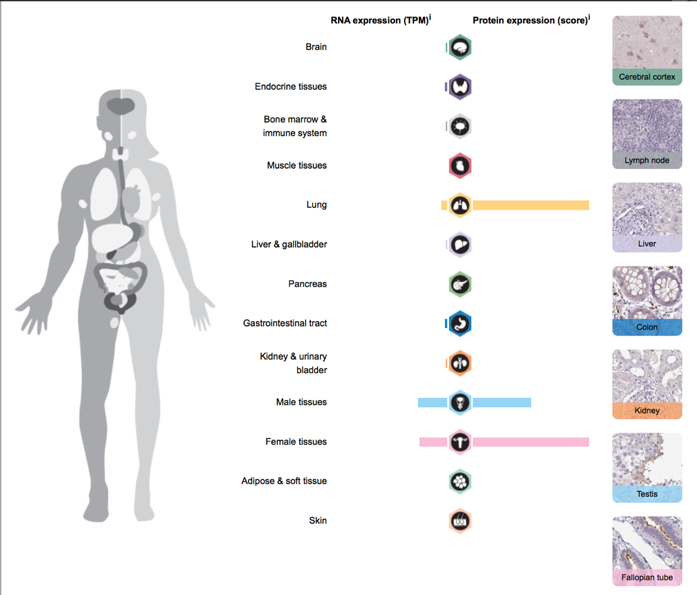
Expression profile for FHAD1 from Human Protein Atlas

FHAD1 has been predicted to be a nuclear protein with 94.1% reliability. It also contains possible nuclear localization signal sequences between 1100–1107 aa. Two pat4 and one pat7 sequences were predicted. Pat4 and pat7 are consensus sequences consisting of clusters of lysine or arginine residues.

== Expression ==
In humans, FHAD1 is expressed in testis, fallopian tube and uterine tissues in females, nasopharynx and bronchi of lungs based on studies found on the Human Protein Atlas. NCBI's EST Profile also showed that FHAD1 is highly expressed in the testis, with some expression in the trachea and esophagus. In mice, the gene was also expressed in the testis, along with the pituitary gland, lung and brain.

== Regulation of expression ==
FHAD1 has a promoter that extends from 15246234 – 15247380 bp and is 1147 bp long. It includes an initial part of the 5' UTR of FHAD1. Some transcription factors predicted to bind to this promoter are:

- MAX binding protein – This protein is likely a transcriptional repressor from the E-box binding factors family
- TR4/TR2 – These proteins are part of a family of nuclear receptors and bind to DR1 (direct repeat) elements of promoters. They act as anchors to recruit other corepressors
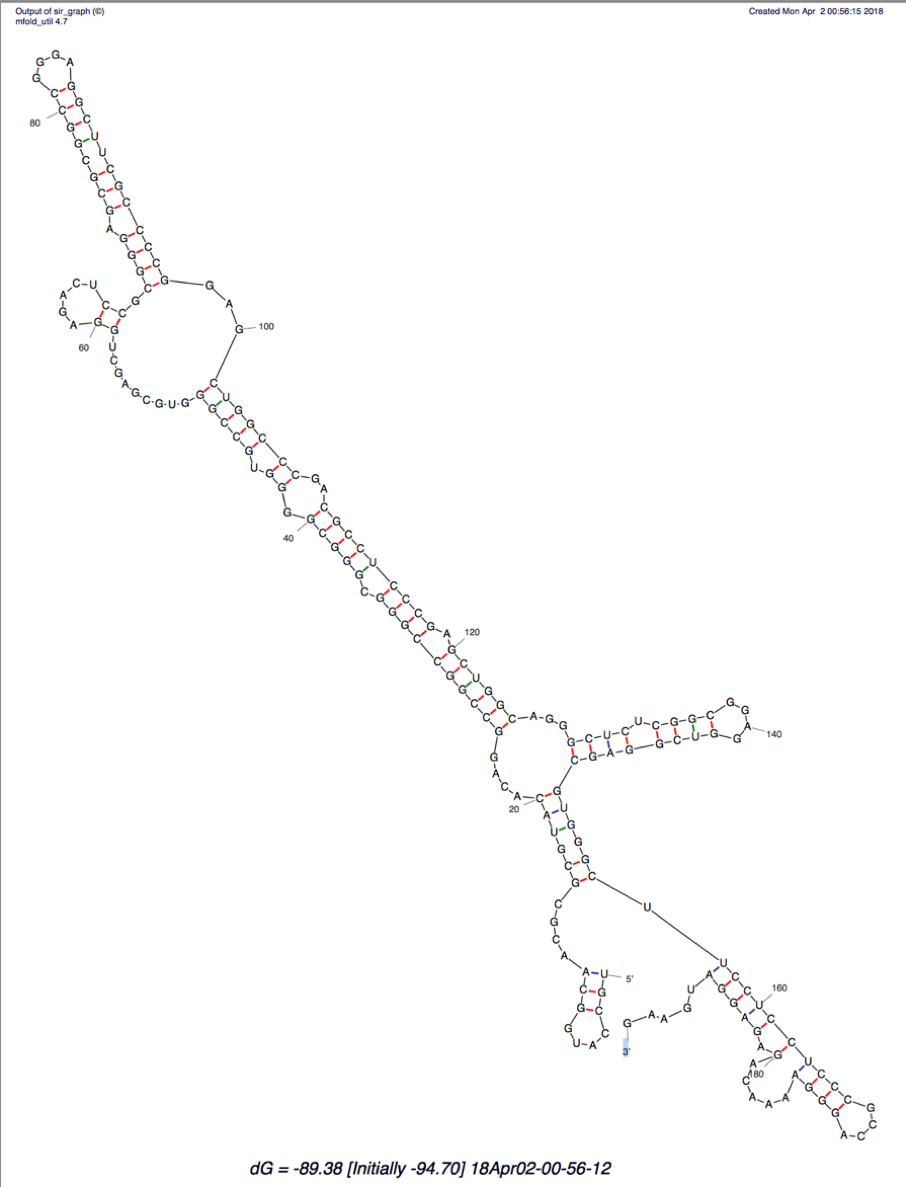
  5' UTR stem loops
- Kaiso – This transcriptional regulator is encoded by the ZBTB33 gene and is involved in response to DNA damage by interacting with p53
- LYL1-E12 – This transcriptional factor is a dimer of two proteins, LYL1 and E12, where E12 is an E-box binding protein. LYL1 is also involved in some leukemias and is a possible oncogenic factor.
- Nur 77 – This protein is also known as NGFIB (Nerve growth factor IB) and belongs to a family of nuclear receptors. It is involved in apoptosis and cell growth pathways.

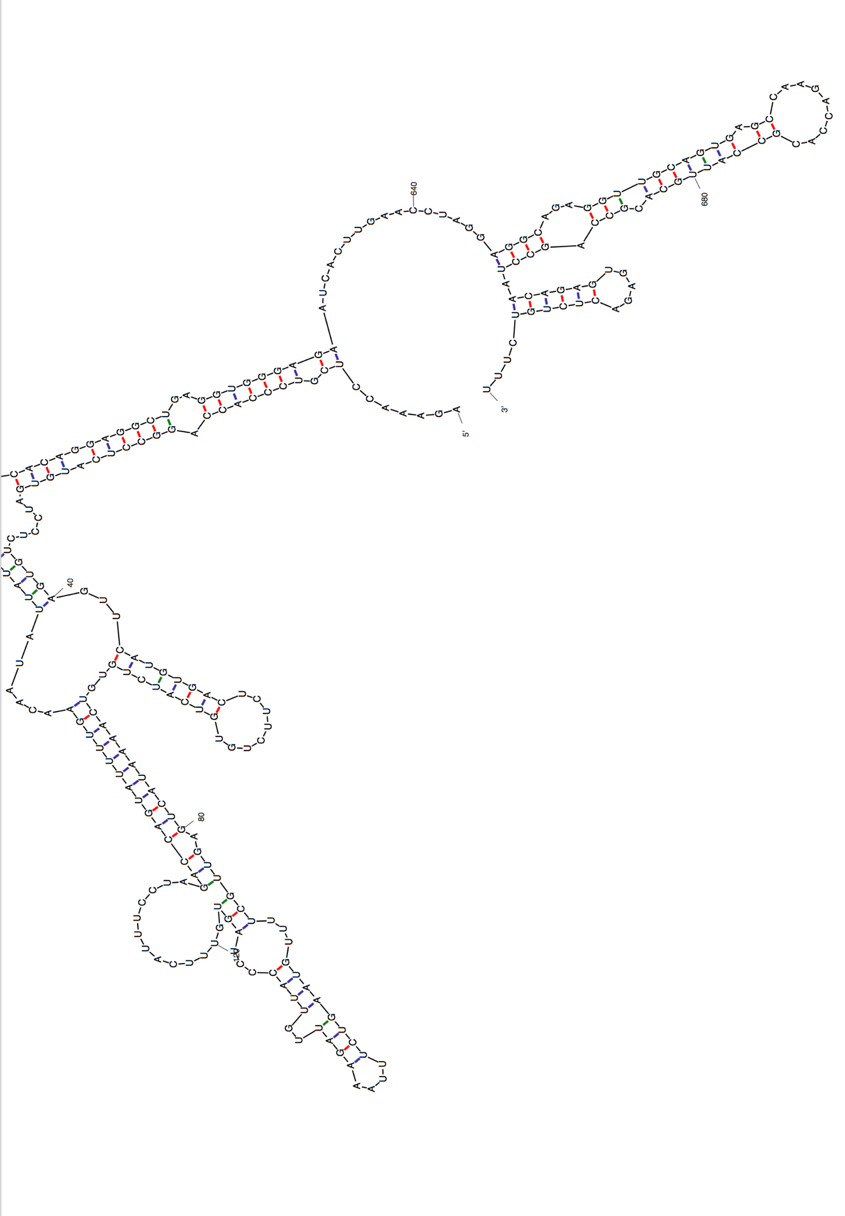
3' UTR stem loops

In the 5' UTR and 3' UTR of FHAD1, multiple stem loops are predicted to form .

== Function ==
FHAD1 can be involved in transcriptional regulation through interaction with other transcriptional regulators.

=== Protein interactions ===
FHAD1 was found to be a binding partner for GTF2IRD1 (GTF2I repeat domain containing protein 1) via a yeast 2 hybrid screen. GTF2I is a gene that encodes the general transcription factor II-1. This specific study showed that GTF2IRD1 is a nuclear protein that is involved transcriptional regulation through chromatin modification. The fact that it exists in the nucleus and was found in neuronal cells correlates with the localization and functional data for FHAD1. Additionally, FHAD1 and GTF2IRD1 interacted through RD2 (repeat domain 2) of GTF2IRD1. RD2 has shown some level of DNA binding activity.

FHAD1 was found to interact (colocalization) with 14-3-3 protein epsilon via cosedimentation. This protein binds to a number of binding partners, mostly by recognizing phosphothreonine or phosphoserine motifs.

=== Clinical significance ===
FHAD1 showed differential expression in patients diagnosed with endometriosis and obesity.

== Homology and evolution ==
FHAD1 has no known paralogs. It has orthologs in the organisms in the following classes: Mammalia, Reptilia, Aves, Sarcopterygii, Actinopterygii, Gastropoda and Lingulata. There was significant conservation in the FHA domain in all the organisms in the table below.

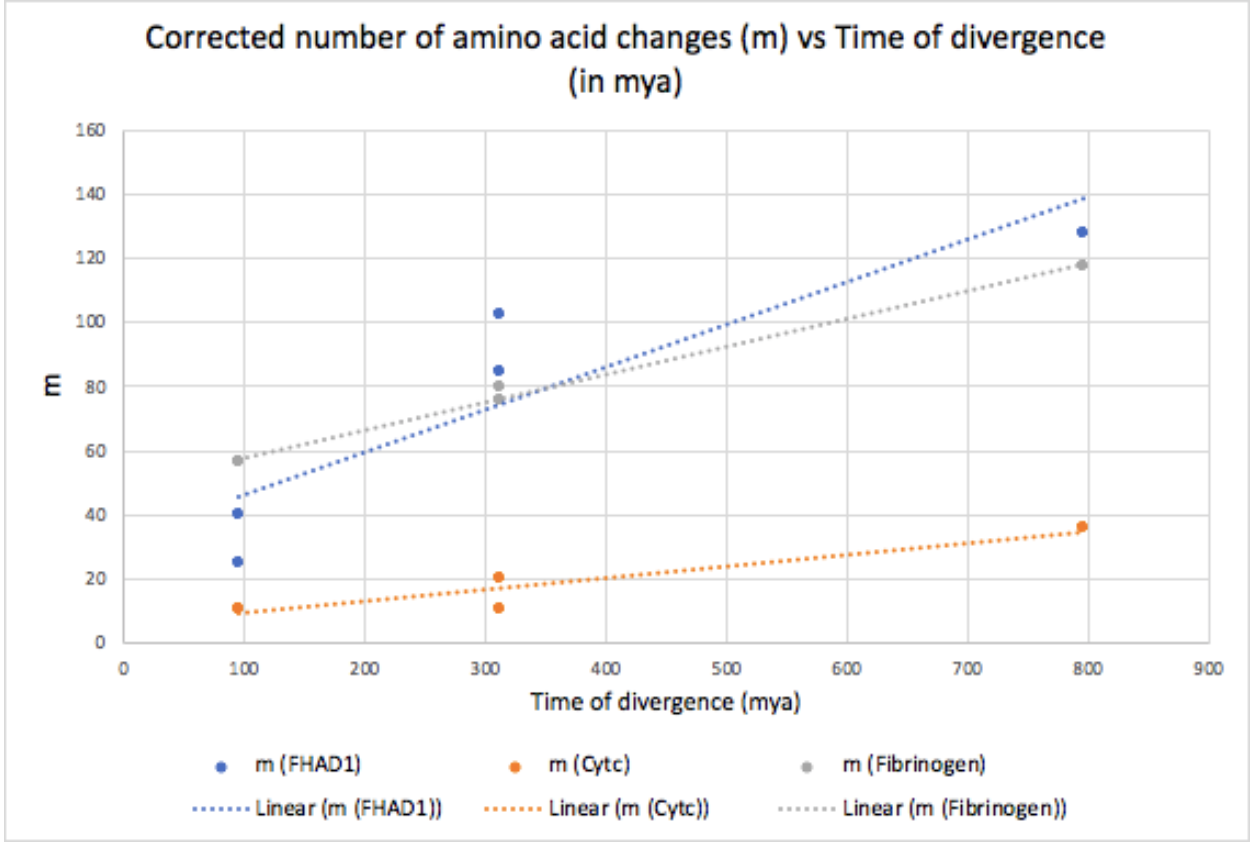
Rate of evolution

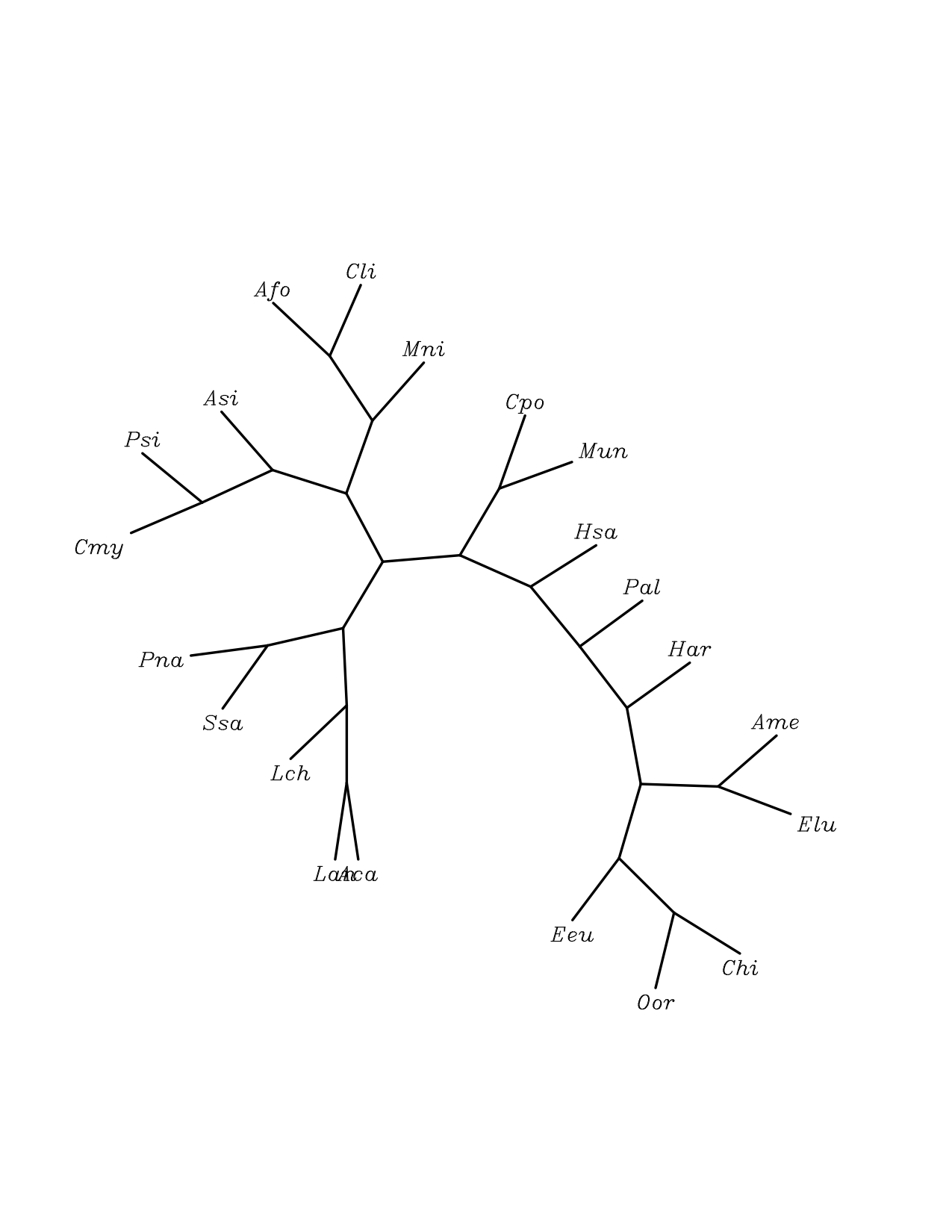
Phylogenetic tree for FHAD1

The rate of evolution of FHAD1 was compared with that of fibrinogen and cytochrome c and it showed that FHAD1 is a rapidly evolving gene.

Orthologs
Common name	Time of divergence (mya)	Sequence identity
Black fruit bat	96	78%
Goat	96	75%
Killer whale	96	75%
Giant Panda	96	75%
Sea otter	96	72%
Guinea Pig	90	71%
Great roundleaf bat	96	71%
European hedgehog	96	67%
Mongolian gerbil	90	63%
Green sea turtle	312	43%
Chinese soft-shell turtle	312	40%
Emperor penguin	312	39%
American alligator	312	38%
Brown mesite	312	38%
Pigeon	312	36%
West Indian Ocean coelacanth	413	33%
Atlantic salmon	435	29%
Red bellied piranha	435	29%
California sea hare/slug	797	28%
