= UNC5A =

Protein-coding gene in the species Homo sapiens

Identifiers
- Aliases: UNC5A, UNC5H1, unc-5 netrin receptor A
- External IDs: OMIM: 607869; MGI: 894682; GeneCards: UNC5A
Available structures
| PDB | Ortholog search: PDBe RCSB |
| PDB | List of PDB id codes 4V2A |

Gene location (Human)
| Chr. | Chromosome 5 (human) |
| Band | 5q35.2 | Start | 176,810,519 bp |
| Band | 5q35.2 | End | 176,880,898 bp |

Gene location (Mouse)
| Chr. | Chromosome 13 (mouse) |
| Band | 13|13 B1 | Start | 55,097,224 bp |
| Band | 13|13 B1 | End | 55,153,831 bp |
RNA expression pattern
| Bgee | Human / Mouse (ortholog); Top expressed in: endothelial cell; middle temporal gyrus; Brodmann area 23; primary visual cortex; right hemisphere of cerebellum; right frontal lobe; prefrontal cortex; superior frontal gyrus; Brodmann area 9; postcentral gyrus / Top expressed in: dentate gyrus of hippocampal formation granule cell; primary visual cortex; secondary oocyte; superior frontal gyrus; lumbar subsegment of spinal cord; hippocampus proper; humerus; transitional epithelium of urinary bladder; primary oocyte; neural layer of retina; More reference expression data |
| BioGPS | n/a |
Gene ontology
| Molecular function | netrin receptor activity |
| Cellular component | intrinsic component of plasma membrane; integral component of membrane; neuronal cell body membrane; membrane raft; plasma membrane; cell projection; neuron projection membrane; membrane |
| Biological process | multicellular organism development; neuron projection development; signal transduction; anterior/posterior axon guidance; axon guidance; apoptotic process; netrin-activated signaling pathway |
Sources:Amigo / QuickGO
Orthologs
| Databases | NCBI: entry; OMA: entry |
| Species | Human | Mouse |
| Entrez | 90249 | 107448 |
| Ensembl | ENSG00000113763 | ENSMUSG00000025876 |
| UniProt | Q6ZN44 | Q8K1S4 |
| RefSeq (mRNA) | NM_133369 | NM_153131; NM_001311128 |
| RefSeq (protein) | NP_588610 | NP_001298057; NP_694771 |
| Location (UCSC) | Chr 5: 176.81 – 176.88 Mb | Chr 13: 55.1 – 55.15 Mb |
| PubMed search |
- Wikidata
| View/Edit Human | View/Edit Mouse |

Netrin receptor UNC5A is a protein that in humans is encoded by the UNC5A gene.

UNC5A belongs to a family of netrin-1 (MIM 601614) receptors thought to mediate the chemorepulsive effect of netrin-1 on specific axons. For more information on UNC5 proteins, see UNC5C (MIM 603610).[supplied by OMIM]

== Interactions ==
UNC5A has been shown to interact with MAGED1.
