= PJA1 =

Protein-coding gene in the species Homo sapiens

Identifiers
- Aliases: PJA1, PRAJA1, RNF70, praja ring finger ubiquitin ligase 1
- External IDs: OMIM: 300420; MGI: 1101765; GeneCards: PJA1
Available structures
PDB	Ortholog search: PDBe RCSB
PDB	List of PDB id codes 2L0B
Enzyme activity
EC #	BRENDA	ExPASy	KEGG	MetaCyc
2.3.2.27	↗	↗	↗	↗

Gene location (Human)
Chr.	X chromosome (human)
Band	Xq13.1	Start	69,160,851 bp
Band	Xq13.1	End	69,165,521 bp

Gene location (Mouse)
Chr.	X chromosome (mouse)
Band	X C3|X 43.38 cM	Start	98,509,340 bp
Band	X C3|X 43.38 cM	End	98,514,879 bp
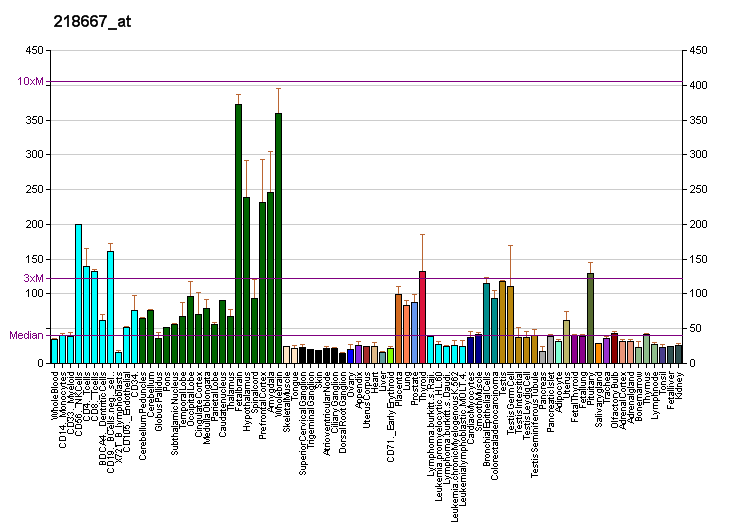
RNA expression pattern
Bgee	Human / Mouse (ortholog); Top expressed in: ganglionic eminence; corpus epididymis; ventricular zone; nucleus accumbens; middle temporal gyrus; anterior cingulate cortex; dorsolateral prefrontal cortex; prefrontal cortex; Brodmann area 9; caudate nucleus / Top expressed in: corneal stroma; CA3 field; perirhinal cortex; entorhinal cortex; Ileal epithelium; dorsomedial hypothalamic nucleus; ventromedial nucleus; paraventricular nucleus of hypothalamus; arcuate nucleus; central gray substance of midbrain; More reference expression data
BioGPS	More reference expression data
Gene ontology
Molecular function	protein binding; metal ion binding; ubiquitin protein ligase activity; transferase activity
Cellular component	cytoplasm
Biological process	protein catabolic process; protein ubiquitination
Sources:Amigo / QuickGO
Orthologs
Databases	NCBI: entry; OMA: entry
Species	Human	Mouse
Entrez	64219	18744
Ensembl	ENSG00000181191	ENSMUSG00000034403
UniProt	Q8NG27	O55176
RefSeq (mRNA)	NM_001032396; NM_022368; NM_145119; NM_001382775; NM_001382776	NM_001083110; NM_001290555; NM_001290556; NM_008853
RefSeq (protein)	NP_001027568; NP_071763; NP_660095; NP_001369704; NP_001369705	NP_001076579; NP_001277484; NP_001277485; NP_032879
Location (UCSC)	Chr X: 69.16 – 69.17 Mb	Chr X: 98.51 – 98.51 Mb
PubMed search
- Wikidata
View/Edit Human	View/Edit Mouse

E3 ubiquitin-protein ligase Praja1 is an enzyme that in humans is encoded by the PJA1 gene.

== Interactions ==
PJA1 has been shown to interact with UBE2D2 and MAGED1.
