= PJA2 =

Protein-coding gene in the species Homo sapiens

Identifiers
- Aliases: PJA2, Neurodap1, RNF131, praja ring finger ubiquitin ligase 2
- External IDs: MGI: 2159342; GeneCards: PJA2
Enzyme activity
EC #	BRENDA	ExPASy	KEGG	MetaCyc
2.3.2.27	↗	↗	↗	↗

Gene location (Human)
Chr.	Chromosome 5 (human)
Band	5q21.3	Start	109,334,713 bp
Band	5q21.3	End	109,409,974 bp

Gene location (Mouse)
Chr.	Chromosome 17 (mouse)
Band	17|17 E1.1	Start	64,588,000 bp
Band	17|17 E1.1	End	64,638,911 bp
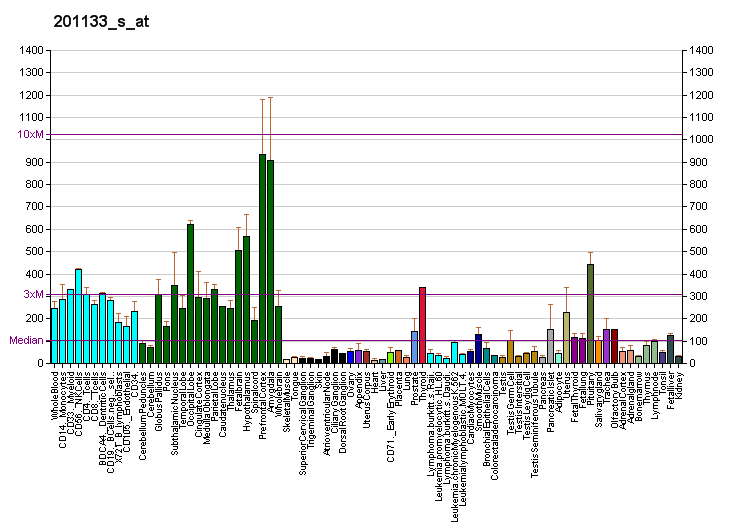
RNA expression pattern
Bgee	Human / Mouse (ortholog); Top expressed in: tail of epididymis; postcentral gyrus; frontal pole; Achilles tendon; Brodmann area 46; prefrontal cortex; orbitofrontal cortex; pons; caput epididymis; superior vestibular nucleus / Top expressed in: interventricular septum; medial dorsal nucleus; dorsal striatum; temporal lobe; olfactory tubercle; globus pallidus; inferior colliculi; facial motor nucleus; Region I of hippocampus proper; nucleus accumbens; More reference expression data
BioGPS	More reference expression data
Gene ontology
Molecular function	protein kinase A regulatory subunit binding; ubiquitin-protein transferase activity; protein kinase A catalytic subunit binding; ubiquitin protein ligase activity; metal ion binding; transferase activity; protein binding
Cellular component	Golgi membrane; postsynaptic density; membrane; endoplasmic reticulum; synapse; plasma membrane; cytoplasm; cell junction; postsynaptic membrane; Golgi apparatus; intermediate filament cytoskeleton; endoplasmic reticulum membrane
Biological process	hippo signaling; regulation of protein kinase A signaling; long-term memory; protein ubiquitination; inflammatory response; positive regulation of toll-like receptor 2 signaling pathway; regulation of macrophage activation; innate immune response; positive regulation of JNK cascade; positive regulation of p38MAPK cascade
Sources:Amigo / QuickGO
Orthologs
Databases	NCBI: entry; OMA: entry
Species	Human	Mouse
Entrez	9867	224938
Ensembl	ENSG00000198961	ENSMUSG00000024083
UniProt	O43164	Q80U04
RefSeq (mRNA)	NM_014819	NM_001025309; NM_144859
RefSeq (protein)	NP_055634	NP_001020480; NP_659108
Location (UCSC)	Chr 5: 109.33 – 109.41 Mb	Chr 17: 64.59 – 64.64 Mb
PubMed search
- Wikidata
View/Edit Human	View/Edit Mouse

E3 ubiquitin-protein ligase Praja2 is an enzyme that in humans is encoded by the PJA2 gene.

== Interactions ==
PJA2 has been shown to interact with UBE2D2.
