= Juliet Daniel =

Canadian biology professor (1964–2026)

- Born: September 19, 1964; Barbados
- Died: April 28, 2026 (aged 61); Dundas, Ontario, Canada
- Citizenship: Barbadian-Canadian
- Education: Queen's University University of British Columbia
- Known for: Discovery and naming of the gene Kaiso
- Scientific career
- Fields: Cancer biology
- Workplaces: St. Jude Children’s Research Hospital; Vanderbilt University

Juliet Michelle Daniel (September 19, 1964 – April 28, 2026) was a Barbadian-Canadian biology professor at McMaster University, where her research focused on cancer biology. Daniel is recognized in the cancer biology field for the discovery and naming of the gene Kaiso, and was the recipient of several prestigious awards in recognition of her research and leadership, including an Ontario Premier Research Excellence Award and a Vice-Chancellor Award from the University of the West Indies.

== Education and career ==
Daniel was born in Barbados on September 19, 1964. In 1987, Daniel completed a bachelor's degree in life sciences at Queen's University, and then a PhD in microbiology at the University of British Columbia in 1993. Daniel completed post-doctoral research fellowships for three years at St. Jude Children's Research Hospital, and then followed her supervisor's move to Vanderbilt University, in Memphis, Tennessee, where she stayed for another three years.

During her fellowship, Daniel discovered the gene Kaiso, and named it after calypso (a popular form of Caribbean music). Daniel found that Kaiso transcriptionally regulates genes involved in cell proliferation and cell adhesion.

Following her post-doctoral fellowship, Daniel joined McMaster University's Department of Biology in November 1999, where she was a full professor. Prof. Daniel's lab studies triple-negative breast cancer (TNBC), specifically to identify genetic risk factors which may explain the prevalence and high mortality associated with TNBC in women of African ancestry. In 2017, Prof. Daniel's lab demonstrated that Kaiso plays a role in the proliferation and survival of TNBC cells.

Daniel's research has been cited more than 4,000 times and she has an h-index of 26. She has been recognized for her research and mentorship by multiple awards, including 100 Accomplished Black Canadian (ABC) Women, a BBPA Harry Jerome Innovation and Technology Award, YWCA Hamilton – Woman of Distinction Award and a Gold Crown of Merit for Cancer Research, Barbados National Honor. Daniel was most recently recognized with a WXN Canada's Most Powerful Women: Top 100 Award.

She has received funding from both national and international agencies, including CIHR, NSERC and the US CDMRP (Congressionally Directed Medical Research Programs) Breast Cancer IDEA Awards.

Daniel mentored African Caribbean students at McMaster University, and within the community of Hamilton. In 2006, Daniel co-founded the Canadian Multicultural LEAD Organization for Mentoring & Training.

== Personal life ==
Daniel was diagnosed with breast cancer. Following treatment, she died on April 28, 2026, in Dundas, Ontario.

== Awards ==
- 2021: University of the West Indies (UWI) Honorary Doctor of Science (DSc), Cave Hill, Barbados
- 2020: WXN Canada's Most Powerful Women: Top 100 Award, Toronto, ON
- 2020 International Women's Day “Black Women in STEM”, Jamaican Canadian Association, Toronto, ON
- 2019: Woman of Purpose Award, Elegant You Tea Party, Toronto, ON
- 2019: University of the West Indies (UWI) Vice Chancellor's Award, Toronto, ON
- 2018: 100 Accomplished Black Canadian (ABC) Women, 100ABC, Toronto, ON
- Harry Jerome Award (Category: Technology and Innovation) (2017).
- Ontario Premier's Excellence in Research Award.
- Barbados Honor Gold Crown of Merit.
- National Ball Award.
- John C. Holland Award (for Professional Achievement).
- Gold Crown of Merit for Cancer Research Barbados National Honor, Barbados (2010);
- Errol Walton Barrow Award of Excellence, Barbados Ball Canada Aid, Toronto (2009);
- African Canadian Achievement Award of Excellence in Science, Toronto (2008)
- Minority Scholar Award, American Association for Cancer Research (2004);
- Ontario Premier Research Excellence Award, McMaster (2001–2006); NSERC pre- (1989–91) & post- (1994–96) doctoral scholarships.
