= Hao–Fountain syndrome =

Neurodevelopmental disorder

Hao–Fountain syndrome (HAFOUS) is a rare neurodevelopmental disorder caused by mutations in the Ubiquitin Specific Protease 7 (USP7) gene. It is characterized by a range of developmental, neurological, and behavioral symptoms. The syndrome was first described in 2015 by Hao et al. and Fountain et al., who identified pathogenic variants in the USP7 gene in individuals with neurodevelopmental abnormalities. The 'Foundation for USP7 Related Diseases' formally announced the naming of the disorder as 'Hao–Fountain syndrome' in 2020, recognizing the contributions of these researchers.

== Genetics ==
Hao–Fountain syndrome is an autosomal dominant disorder, meaning that a single copy of an abnormal USP7 gene is sufficient to cause the condition. Most reported cases are de novo mutations, meaning the genetic change is new in the affected individual and not inherited from a parent. The USP7 gene is located at chromosome 16p13.2.

The USP7 gene encodes for ubiquitin-specific protease 7, a deubiquitinating enzyme (DUB). DUBs are crucial for regulating protein stability, localization, and function by removing ubiquitin tags from target proteins. USP7 plays a multifaceted role in various cellular processes, including DNA repair, transcriptional regulation, epigenetic control, and immune response. In the context of Hao–Fountain syndrome, USP7 is particularly implicated in the endosomal protein recycling pathway, where it fine-tunes the activity of the actin nucleation-promoting factor WASH. Dysregulation of USP7's normal function due to pathogenic variants leads to the diverse symptoms observed in Hao–Fountain syndrome.

== Discovery ==
The initial discovery and characterization of what is now known as Hao–Fountain syndrome arose from a series of collaborative research efforts. The first breakthrough came with a study published in Molecular Cell in 2015, led by Yi-Heng Hao and Ryan Potts. This paper identified the critical role of the USP7 gene in cellular protein recycling and, crucially, reported its mutation in individuals presenting with a previously undefined neurodevelopmental disorder. Key contributing authors on this publication included Michael Fountain and Christian P. Schaaf, indicating their early involvement in identifying this genetic link.

Building upon these initial findings, Fountain served as the lead author on a subsequent comprehensive study published in Genetics in Medicine in 2019. This publication expanded the understanding of the clinical spectrum associated with pathogenic USP7 variants, detailing the characteristic neurodevelopmental phenotype, including pervasive speech delays, distinctive behavioral patterns, and various neurological anomalies observed in a larger cohort of affected individuals. Notably, Schaaf was also a co-author on this 2019 paper, further highlighting his sustained contribution to defining the syndrome.

Following these publications, the disorder was officially recognized and designated in the Online Mendelian Inheritance in Man (OMIM) database as Hao–Fountain syndrome (OMIM #616863). This formal inclusion in OMIM is a crucial step in the classification of genetic disorders. Subsequently, the Foundation for USP7 Related Diseases publicly announced and adopted the name Hao–Fountain syndrome in 2020, further solidifying its recognition within the patient and research community. Schaaf's continued research, including more recent work from his laboratory at Heidelberg University, consistently contributes to a deeper understanding of the functional implications of USP7 pathogenic variants and the underlying molecular mechanisms of the syndrome.

== Clinical presentation ==
Patient at different ages showing the characteristic features of Hao-Fountain syndrome.

Individuals with Hao–Fountain syndrome present with a variable spectrum of clinical features, with common signs and symptoms including:

- Neurodevelopmental delays: Global developmental delay is highly prevalent, often including delays in motor function (fine, gross, and oral) and intellectual disability, which can range from mild to severe.
- Speech and language difficulties: Severe speech delay is a hallmark feature, with many individuals being non-verbal or having very limited speech.
- Behavioral abnormalities: These can include features of autism spectrum disorder (ASD), attention deficit hyperactivity disorder (ADHD), impulsivity, compulsivity, stubbornness, temper tantrums, and aggressive behaviors.
- Neurological anomalies: Hypotonia (low muscle tone) is common and can contribute to delayed walking and unsteady gait. Seizures/epilepsy may also occur. Brain MRI anomalies, such as white matter abnormalities, have been reported.
- Ocular anomalies: Common eye issues include hyperopia (farsightedness), myopia (nearsightedness), esotropia (inward turning of one or both eyes), strabismus (misalignment of the eyes), and nystagmus (involuntary eye movements).
- Gastrointestinal issues: Feeding difficulties, chronic constipation, and/or diarrhea have been noted.
- Dysmorphic features: Mild facial dysmorphism is frequently observed.
- Other possible features: Hypogonadism in males, small hands and feet, dental anomalies, altered pain thresholds, temperature instability, short stature, obesity, and scoliosis/kyphosis (curvature of the spine) have also been reported in some individuals.

The severity and combination of these symptoms can vary significantly among affected individuals, even within the same family, although most reported cases are de novo.

== Diagnosis ==
Diagnosis of Hao–Fountain syndrome typically involves genetic testing, such as whole-exome sequencing or chromosomal microarray analysis, to identify pathogenic variants or deletions in the USP7 gene. Due to shared characteristics with other neurodevelopmental disorders, initial misdiagnosis is possible.

== Management ==
Currently, there are no specific treatments that target the underlying genetic cause of Hao–Fountain syndrome. Management is primarily supportive and multidisciplinary, addressing the various symptoms and developmental challenges. This may include:

- Early intervention therapies: Physical therapy, occupational therapy, and speech therapy are crucial for addressing developmental delays and improving motor and communication skills.
- Behavioral therapies: To manage behavioral issues and support individuals with Autism Spectrum Disorder or ADHD.
- Medical management: For seizures, feeding difficulties, gastrointestinal issues, and other medical complications. Regular ophthalmological evaluations are recommended for eye anomalies.
- Educational support: Tailored educational programs to support learning abilities, which can range from severe intellectual disability to borderline intellectual functioning.

Research into the molecular mechanisms of USP7 malfunction in Hao–Fountain syndrome is ongoing, with a focus on understanding the enzyme's activity, stability, and allosteric modulation, which may pave the way for targeted treatments in the future.

== Research and advocacy ==
The Foundation for USP7 Related Diseases is a non-profit organization dedicated to supporting individuals and families affected by Hao–Fountain syndrome. Their mission includes funding research to understand the disorder better and identify potential treatments or cures, as well as connecting and supporting affected families worldwide. Efforts are also underway to identify more patients to expand understanding of the phenotypic spectrum of the syndrome. The Foundation for USP7 Related Diseases offers multiple resources for families.
