= UBE2D2 =

Protein-coding gene in the species Homo sapiens

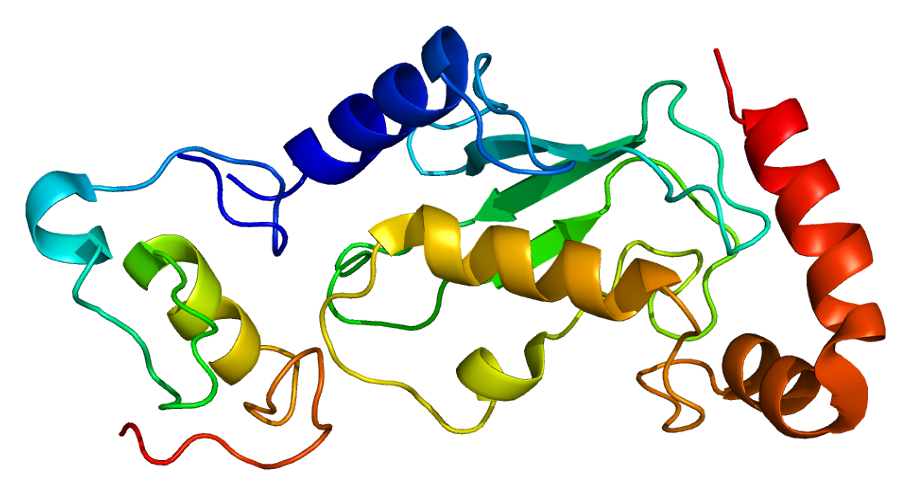

Identifiers
- Aliases: UBE2D2, E2(17)KB2, PUBC1, UBC4, UBC4/5, UBCH4, UBCH5B, ubiquitin conjugating enzyme E2 D2
- External IDs: OMIM: 602962; MGI: 1930715; GeneCards: UBE2D2
Available structures
PDB	Ortholog search: PDBe RCSB
PDB	List of PDB id codes 1UR6, 1W4U, 2CLW, 2ESK, 2ESO, 2ESP, 2ESQ, 3A33, 3JVZ, 3JW0, 3L1Y, 3TGD, 3ZNI, 4A49, 4A4B, 4A4C, 4AUQ, 4DDG, 4LDT, 4V3K, 4V3L, 4WZ3, 5D1L, 5D1K, 5D0M, 5D0K, 5D1M, 5EDV
Enzyme activity
EC #	BRENDA	ExPASy	KEGG	MetaCyc
2.3.2.23	↗	↗	↗	↗
2.3.2.24	↗	↗	↗	↗

Gene location (Human)
Chr.	Chromosome 5 (human)
Band	5q31.2	Start	139,526,431 bp
Band	5q31.2	End	139,628,434 bp

Gene location (Mouse)
Chr.	Chromosome 18 (mouse)
Band	18|18 B2	Start	35,904,611 bp
Band	18|18 B2	End	35,942,547 bp
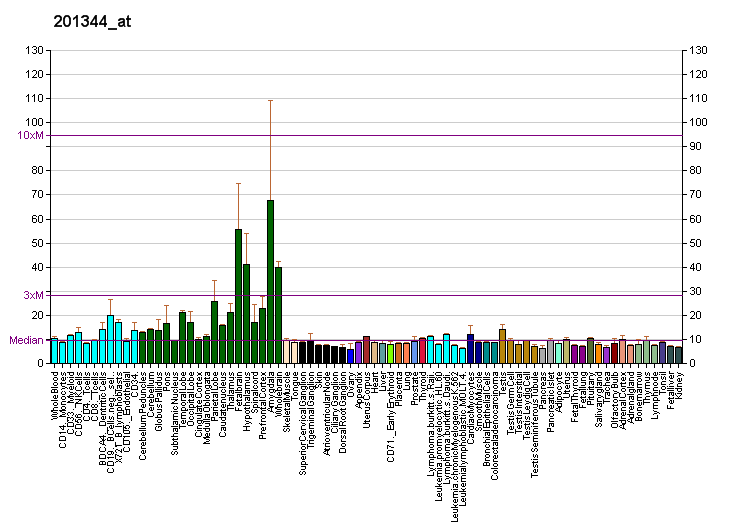

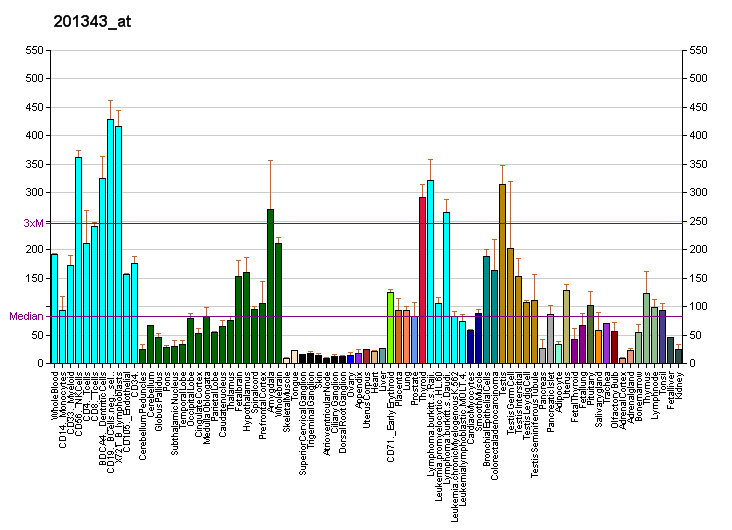

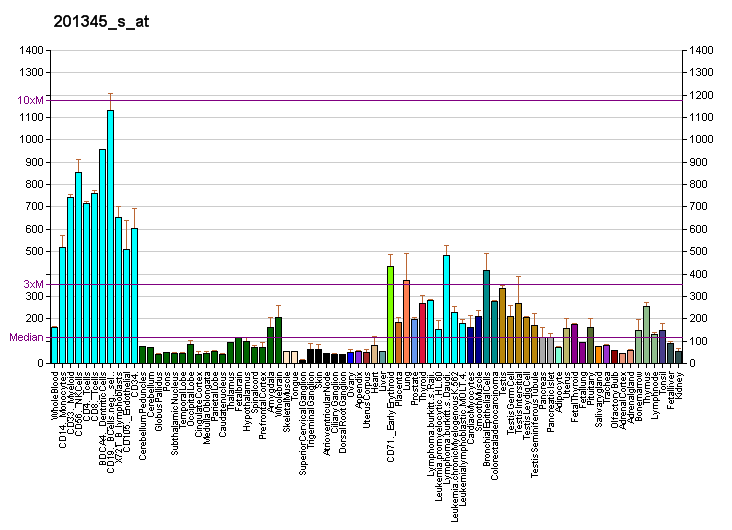
RNA expression pattern
Bgee	Human / Mouse (ortholog); Top expressed in: ventricular zone; ganglionic eminence; right testis; left testis; right uterine tube; gastrocnemius muscle; granulocyte; sperm; rectum; tibial arteries / Top expressed in: Gonadal ridge; ventral tegmental area; external carotid artery; dorsomedial hypothalamic nucleus; pineal gland; mammillary body; paraventricular nucleus of hypothalamus; human fetus; median eminence; dorsal tegmental nucleus; More reference expression data
BioGPS	More reference expression data
Gene ontology
Molecular function	transferase activity; nucleotide binding; ubiquitin-protein transferase activity; protein binding; ATP binding; ubiquitin conjugating enzyme activity; ubiquitin protein ligase binding
Cellular component	cytosol; ubiquitin ligase complex; nucleoplasm; extracellular exosome; protein-containing complex
Biological process	ubiquitin-dependent protein catabolic process; protein polyubiquitination; stimulatory C-type lectin receptor signaling pathway; TRIF-dependent toll-like receptor signaling pathway; Fc-epsilon receptor signaling pathway; protein K48-linked ubiquitination; regulation of transcription from RNA polymerase II promoter in response to hypoxia; T cell receptor signaling pathway; protein autoubiquitination; protein ubiquitination; MyD88-independent toll-like receptor signaling pathway; protein targeting to peroxisome; protein K11-linked ubiquitination
Sources:Amigo / QuickGO
Orthologs
Databases	NCBI: entry; OMA: entry
Species	Human	Mouse
Entrez	7322	56550
Ensembl	ENSG00000131508	ENSMUSG00000091896
UniProt	P62837	P62838
RefSeq (mRNA)	NM_003339; NM_181838	NM_019912
RefSeq (protein)	NP_003330; NP_862821	NP_064296
Location (UCSC)	Chr 5: 139.53 – 139.63 Mb	Chr 18: 35.9 – 35.94 Mb
PubMed search
- Wikidata
View/Edit Human	View/Edit Mouse

Ubiquitin-conjugating enzyme E2 D2 is a protein that in humans is encoded by the UBE2D2 gene.

== Function ==
Modifying proteins with ubiquitin is an important cellular mechanism for targeting abnormal or short-lived proteins for degradation. Ubiquitination involves at least three classes of enzymes: ubiquitin-activating enzymes, or E1s; ubiquitin-conjugating enzymes, or E2s; and ubiquitin-protein ligases, or E3s. This gene encodes a member of the E2 ubiquitin-conjugating enzyme family. This enzyme functions in the ubiquitination of the tumor-suppressor protein p53, which is induced by an E3 ubiquitin-protein ligase. Two alternatively spliced transcript variants have been found for this gene, and they encode distinct isoforms.

== Interactions ==
UBE2D2 has been shown to interact with:

- Baculoviral IAP repeat-containing protein 3,
- NEDD4,
- PJA1,
- PJA2, and
- UBE3A.
