= MAGED1 =

Protein-coding gene in humans

Identifiers
- Aliases: MAGED1, DLXIN-1, NRAGE, MAGE family member D1
- External IDs: OMIM: 300224; MGI: 1930187; GeneCards: MAGED1

Gene location (Human)
Chr.	X chromosome (human)
Band	Xp11.22	Start	51,803,007 bp
Band	Xp11.22	End	51,902,354 bp

Gene location (Mouse)
Chr.	X chromosome (mouse)
Band	X C3|X 41.56 cM	Start	93,579,080 bp
Band	X C3|X 41.56 cM	End	93,585,749 bp
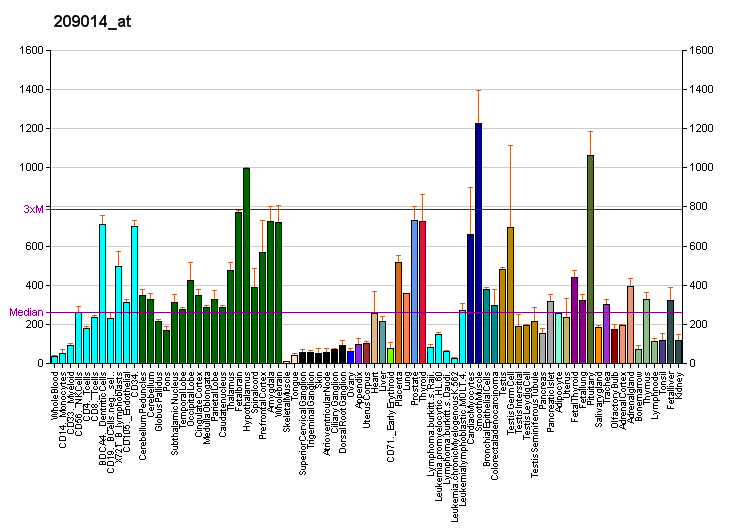
RNA expression pattern
Bgee	Human / Mouse (ortholog); Top expressed in: ventricular zone; stromal cell of endometrium; ganglionic eminence; pituitary gland; anterior pituitary; tibia; frontal pole; middle temporal gyrus; right adrenal cortex; left adrenal cortex / Top expressed in: mandibular prominence; median eminence; maxillary prominence; arcuate nucleus; dorsomedial hypothalamic nucleus; choroid plexus of fourth ventricle; ventromedial nucleus; islet of Langerhans; Gonadal ridge; hand; More reference expression data
BioGPS	More reference expression data
Gene ontology
Molecular function	transcription coactivator activity; protein binding; identical protein binding
Cellular component	cytoplasm; nucleus; membrane; plasma membrane; chromatin; protein-containing complex
Biological process	rhythmic process; regulation of circadian rhythm; regulation of apoptotic process; positive regulation of branching involved in ureteric bud morphogenesis; regulation of transcription by RNA polymerase II; positive regulation of apoptotic signaling pathway; positive regulation of transcription, DNA-templated; negative regulation of epithelial cell proliferation; circadian regulation of gene expression; regulation of transcription, DNA-templated; positive regulation of MAP kinase activity; negative regulation of transcription, DNA-templated
Sources:Amigo / QuickGO
Orthologs
Databases	NCBI: entry; OMA: entry
Species	Human	Mouse
Entrez	9500	94275
Ensembl	ENSG00000179222	ENSMUSG00000025151
UniProt	Q9Y5V3	Q9QYH6
RefSeq (mRNA)	NM_001005332; NM_001005333; NM_006986	NM_019791
RefSeq (protein)	NP_001005332; NP_001005333; NP_008917	NP_062765
Location (UCSC)	Chr X: 51.8 – 51.9 Mb	Chr X: 93.58 – 93.59 Mb
PubMed search
- Wikidata
View/Edit Human	View/Edit Mouse

Melanoma-associated antigen D1 is a protein that in humans is encoded by the MAGED1 gene.

== Function ==
This gene is a member of the melanoma antigen gene (MAGE) family. Most of the genes of this family encode tumor specific antigens that are not expressed in normal adult tissues except testis. Although the protein encoded by this gene shares strong homology with members of the MAGE family, it is expressed in almost all normal adult tissues. This gene has been demonstrated to be involved in the p75 neurotrophin receptor mediated programmed cell death pathway. Three transcript variants encoding two different isoforms have been found for this gene.

MAGED was found to be deleted in a group of children with an intellectual disability disorder caused by a Xp11.22 deletion.

Maged1 plays a role in controlling the reward circuitry in the brain of mice that is responsible for addictive behaviors. More recently, it has been shown to play a role in drug addiction through an epigenetic mechanism involving the monoubiquitination of H2A, which represses gene expression via interaction with the deubiquitinase USP7.

== Interactions ==
MAGED1 has been shown to interact with UNC5A, PJA1, XIAP, and USP7.
