= PRAM1 =

Protein-coding gene in the species Homo sapiens

Identifiers
- Aliases: PRAM1, PML-RAR, PRAM-1, PML-RARA regulated adaptor molecule 1
- External IDs: OMIM: 606466; MGI: 3576625; GeneCards: PRAM1

Gene location (Human)
Chr.	Chromosome 19 (human)
Band	19p13.2	Start	8,490,056 bp
Band	19p13.2	End	8,502,640 bp

Gene location (Mouse)
Chr.	Chromosome 17 (mouse)
Band	17|17 B1	Start	33,857,030 bp
Band	17|17 B1	End	33,864,680 bp
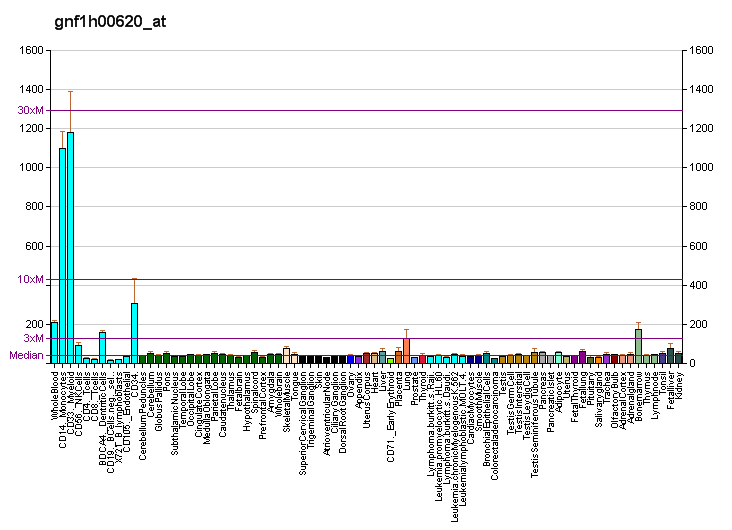
RNA expression pattern
Bgee	Human / Mouse (ortholog); Top expressed in: monocyte; granulocyte; blood; bone marrow cell; trabecular bone; spleen; C1 segment; upper lobe of left lung; right lung; appendix / Top expressed in: granulocyte; bone marrow; neural layer of retina; cerebellar cortex; morula; primary oocyte; embryo; hypothalamus; spermatocyte; blastocyst; More reference expression data
BioGPS	More reference expression data
Gene ontology
Molecular function	protein binding; lipid binding; protein kinase binding
Cellular component	protein-containing complex; plasma membrane
Biological process	signal transduction; integrin-mediated signaling pathway; regulation of neutrophil degranulation; T cell receptor signaling pathway; protein localization to plasma membrane
Sources:Amigo / QuickGO
Orthologs
Databases	NCBI: entry; OMA: entry
Species	Human	Mouse
Entrez	84106	378460
Ensembl	ENSG00000133246	ENSMUSG00000032739
UniProt	Q96QH2	Q6BCL1
RefSeq (mRNA)	NM_032152	NM_001002842
RefSeq (protein)	NP_115528	NP_001002842
Location (UCSC)	Chr 19: 8.49 – 8.5 Mb	Chr 17: 33.86 – 33.86 Mb
PubMed search
- Wikidata
View/Edit Human	View/Edit Mouse

PML-RARA-regulated adapter molecule 1 is a protein that in humans is encoded by the PRAM1 gene.

== Function ==
The protein encoded by this gene is similar to FYN binding protein (FYB/SLAP-130), which is an adaptor protein involved in T cell receptor mediated signaling. This gene is expressed and regulated during normal myelopoiesis. The expression of this gene is induced by retinoic acid and is inhibited by the expression of PML-RARalpha, a fusion protein of promyelocytic leukemia (PML) and the retinoic acid receptor-alpha (RARalpha).

== Interactions ==
PRAM1 has been shown to interact with TRIM27.
