= Phosphopeptide =

Phosphopeptides are modified self antigens which may induce an immune response.

Protein phosphorylation is a very important and frequent post-translational modification that can impact a protein's localization, stability, and whether or not it can dimerize or form stable bonds with other substances. It is vital to pinpoint which amino acid in the protein’s primary structure is being phosphorylated in order to understand the functions of a phosphopeptide. This is accomplished through phosphopeptide mapping, which involves digestion of a radioactively labeled protein, separation of phosphopeptide products, and finally analysis via high-performance liquid chromatography (HPLC) or mass spectrometry. Analysis of phosphopeptides can provide information about which amino acids are phosphorylated and how many sites on the primary sequence are phosphorylated.

Phosphorylation of serine and threonine residues is conserved during MHC class I and MHC class II antigen processing. Phosphopeptides are thus displayed on the surface of cells. As modified self antigens, they are potentially immunogenic when compared to unmodified self proteins as the immune cells (T-cells) which recognise them are possibly not subject to central tolerance mechanisms. This may contribute to the potential capability of phosophopeptides to serve as tumor antigens in the treatment of colorectal cancer.
