= SPOP =

Protein-coding gene in humans

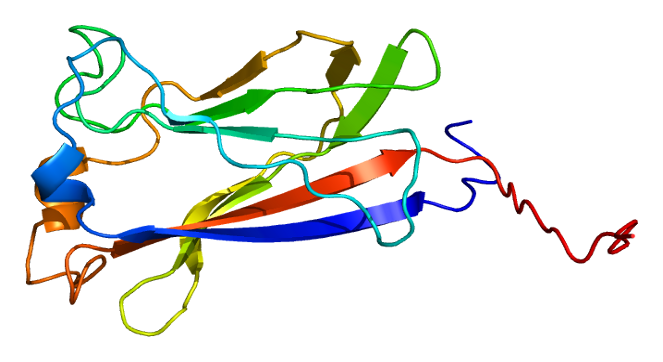

Identifiers
- Aliases: SPOP, BTBD32, TEF2, speckle type BTB/POZ protein, NEDMIDF, NSDVS1, NSDVS2, NEDMACE
- External IDs: OMIM: 602650; MGI: 1343085; GeneCards: SPOP
Available structures
PDB	Ortholog search: PDBe RCSB
PDB	List of PDB id codes 2CR2, 3HQH, 3HQI, 3HQL, 3HQM, 3HTM, 3HU6, 3IVB, 3IVQ, 3IVV, 4EOZ, 4HS2, 4J8Z, 4O1V

Gene location (Human)
Chr.	Chromosome 17 (human)
Band	17q21.33	Start	49,598,884 bp
Band	17q21.33	End	49,678,163 bp

Gene location (Mouse)
Chr.	Chromosome 11 (mouse)
Band	11 D|11 59.01 cM	Start	95,304,906 bp
Band	11 D|11 59.01 cM	End	95,384,232 bp
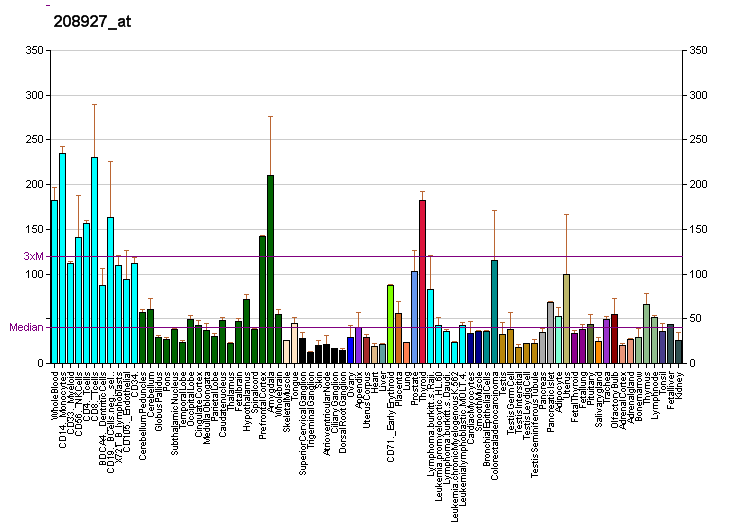

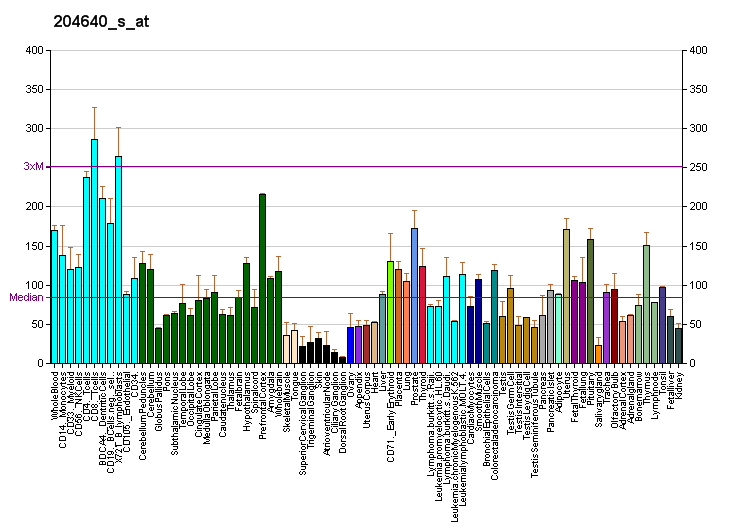
RNA expression pattern
Bgee	Human / Mouse (ortholog); Top expressed in: nipple; muscle layer of sigmoid colon; saphenous vein; pylorus; seminal vesicula; popliteal artery; tibial arteries; urethra; cardia; smooth muscle tissue / Top expressed in: temporal muscle; triceps brachii muscle; cerebellar vermis; ankle; lobe of cerebellum; sternocleidomastoid muscle; neural layer of retina; digastric muscle; parotid gland; blood; More reference expression data
BioGPS	More reference expression data
Gene ontology
Molecular function	protein binding; ubiquitin protein ligase binding
Cellular component	Cul3-RING ubiquitin ligase complex; nuclear speck; nucleus; nucleoplasm; cytoplasm; SCF ubiquitin ligase complex
Biological process	protein ubiquitination; regulation of proteolysis; negative regulation of transcription by RNA polymerase II; glucose homeostasis; proteasome-mediated ubiquitin-dependent protein catabolic process; negative regulation of DNA-binding transcription factor activity; positive regulation of endoplasmic reticulum stress-induced intrinsic apoptotic signaling pathway; positive regulation of type B pancreatic cell apoptotic process; ubiquitin-dependent protein catabolic process
Sources:Amigo / QuickGO
Orthologs
Databases	NCBI: entry; OMA: entry
Species	Human	Mouse
Entrez	8405	20747
Ensembl	ENSG00000121067	ENSMUSG00000057522
UniProt	O43791	Q6ZWS8
RefSeq (mRNA)	NM_001007226; NM_001007227; NM_001007228; NM_001007229; NM_001007230 NM_003563; NM_001370730; NM_001370731; NM_001370732	NM_025287; NM_001359107
RefSeq (protein)	NP_001007227; NP_001007228; NP_001007229; NP_001007230; NP_001007231 NP_003554; NP_001357659; NP_001357660; NP_001357661	NP_079563; NP_001346036
Location (UCSC)	Chr 17: 49.6 – 49.68 Mb	Chr 11: 95.3 – 95.38 Mb
PubMed search
- Wikidata
View/Edit Human	View/Edit Mouse

Speckle-type POZ protein is a protein that in humans is encoded by the SPOP gene.

This gene encodes a protein that may modulate the transcriptional repression activities of death-associated protein 6 (DAXX), which interacts with histone deacetylase, core histones, and other histone-associated proteins. In mouse, the encoded protein binds to the putative leucine zipper domain of macroH2A1.2, a variant H2A histone that is enriched on inactivated X chromosomes. The BTB/POZ domain of this protein has been shown in other proteins to mediate transcriptional repression and to interact with components of histone deacetylase co-repressor complexes. Alternative splicing of this gene results in multiple transcript variants encoding the same protein.

== DNA repair ==
The spop gene is the gene most commonly point mutated in human primary prostate cancers. SPOP protein is essential for the repair of DNA-protein crosslinks by removing topoisomerase 2A from the topoisomerase2A-DNA cleavage complex formed during repair.

== Clinical relevance ==
Mutations in SPOP lead to a type of prostate tumor thought to be involved in about 15% of all prostate cancers.
