= TMEM51 =

Protein-coding gene in humans

Identifiers
- Aliases: TMEM51, C1orf72, transmembrane protein 51
- External IDs: MGI: 2384874; GeneCards: TMEM51

Gene location (Human)
Chr.	Chromosome 1 (human)
Band	1p36.21	Start	15,152,532 bp
Band	1p36.21	End	15,220,478 bp

Gene location (Mouse)
Chr.	Chromosome 4 (mouse)
Band	4|4 D3	Start	141,758,303 bp
Band	4|4 D3	End	141,811,615 bp
RNA expression pattern
Bgee	Human / Mouse (ortholog); Top expressed in: body of pancreas; oocyte; body of stomach; cartilage tissue; mucosa of transverse colon; stromal cell of endometrium; gallbladder; buccal mucosa cell; islet of Langerhans; right adrenal cortex / Top expressed in: stomach; right kidney; proximal tubule; ileum; duodenum; yolk sac; jejunum; human kidney; urinary bladder; colon; More reference expression data
BioGPS	n/a
Gene ontology
Molecular function	protein binding; molecular function
Cellular component	membrane; integral component of membrane; cellular component
Biological process	biological process
Sources:Amigo / QuickGO
Orthologs
Databases	NCBI: entry; OMA: entry
Species	Human	Mouse
Entrez	55092	214359
Ensembl	ENSG00000171729	ENSMUSG00000040616
UniProt	Q9NW97; Q9BSA0	Q99LG1
RefSeq (mRNA)	NM_001136216; NM_001136217; NM_001136218; NM_018022; NM_001319665	NM_145402
RefSeq (protein)	NP_001129688; NP_001129689; NP_001129690; NP_001306594; NP_060492 NP_001306594.1	NP_663377
Location (UCSC)	Chr 1: 15.15 – 15.22 Mb	Chr 4: 141.76 – 141.81 Mb
PubMed search
- Wikidata
View/Edit Human	View/Edit Mouse

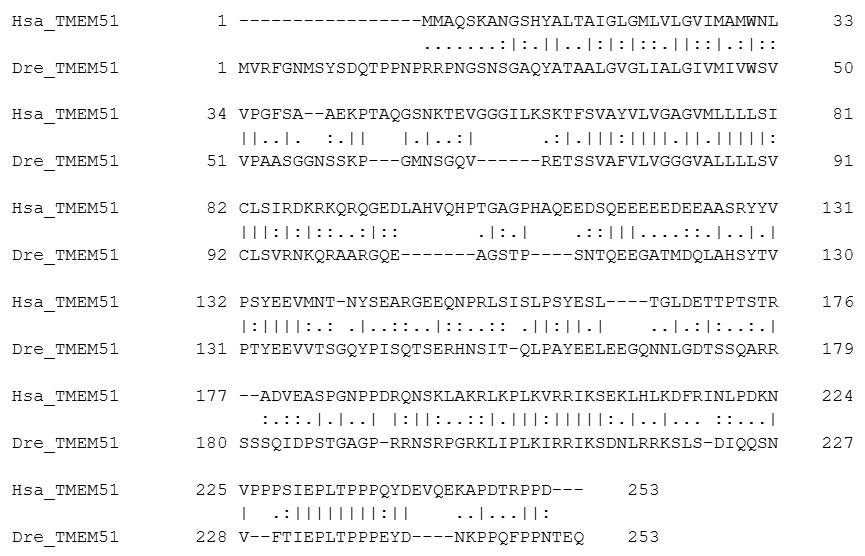
Pairwise Alignment of Human (Homo sapiens) TMEM51 and Zebrafish (Danio rerio) TMEM51 Amino Acid Sequences

Transmembrane protein 51 is a protein in humans that is encoded by the TMEM51 gene. It is located on the first chromosome (1p36.21) and has 6 isoforms in humans. It has orthologs in mammals, birds, reptiles, amphibians, and fish.

It is predicted to be a transmembrane protein due to the transmembrane regions within its coding sequence.

TMEM51-AS1 (a long non-coding RNA from the TMEM51 locus) acts as a tumor suppressor when overexpressed, inhibiting cancer cell progression. Mutations or polymorphisms of the TMEM51 are associated susceptibility to Reynaud's syndrome.
