= ZBTB33 =

Protein-coding gene in the species Homo sapiens

Identifiers
- Aliases: ZBTB33, ZNF-kaiso, ZNF348, zinc finger and BTB domain containing 33
- External IDs: OMIM: 300329; MGI: 1927290; GeneCards: ZBTB33
Available structures
| PDB | Ortholog search: PDBe RCSB |
| PDB | List of PDB id codes 2LT7, 3FKC, 3M4T, 3M8V, 4F6M, 4F6N |

Gene location (Human)
| Chr. | X chromosome (human) |
| Band | Xq24 | Start | 120,250,752 bp |
| Band | Xq24 | End | 120,258,398 bp |

Gene location (Mouse)
| Chr. | X chromosome (mouse) |
| Band | X|X A3.3 | Start | 37,278,670 bp |
| Band | X|X A3.3 | End | 37,285,923 bp |
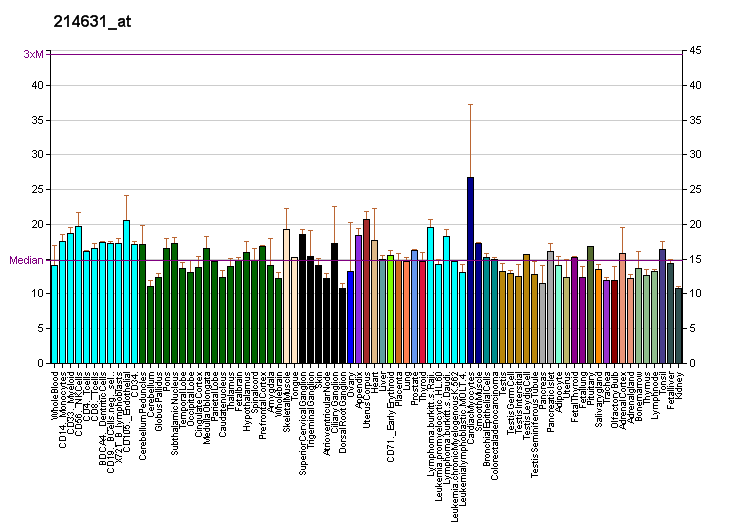
RNA expression pattern
| Bgee | Human / Mouse (ortholog); Top expressed in: secondary oocyte; skin of thigh; endothelial cell; skin of hip; Brodmann area 23; gingival epithelium; epithelium of nasopharynx; corpus epididymis; bronchial epithelial cell; middle temporal gyrus / Top expressed in: medial ganglionic eminence; hair follicle; condyle; pineal gland; vestibular membrane of cochlear duct; trigeminal ganglion; Epithelium of choroid plexus; transitional epithelium of urinary bladder; parotid gland; fossa; More reference expression data |
| BioGPS | More reference expression data |
Gene ontology
| Molecular function | methyl-CpG binding; sequence-specific DNA binding; DNA binding; protein binding; metal ion binding; nucleic acid binding; DNA-binding transcription factor activity, RNA polymerase II-specific |
| Cellular component | plasma membrane; nucleolus; nucleus; nucleoplasm; cytoplasm; cytosol |
| Biological process | intracellular signal transduction; negative regulation of transcription, DNA-templated; regulation of transcription, DNA-templated; Wnt signaling pathway; transcription, DNA-templated; regulation of transcription by RNA polymerase II |
Sources:Amigo / QuickGO
Orthologs
| Databases | NCBI: entry; OMA: entry |
| Species | Human | Mouse |
| Entrez | 10009 | 56805 |
| Ensembl | ENSG00000177485 | ENSMUSG00000048047 |
| UniProt | Q86T24 | Q8BN78 |
| RefSeq (mRNA) | NM_006777; NM_001184742 | NM_001079513; NM_020256 |
| RefSeq (protein) | NP_001171671; NP_006768 | NP_001072981; NP_064652 |
| Location (UCSC) | Chr X: 120.25 – 120.26 Mb | Chr X: 37.28 – 37.29 Mb |
| PubMed search |
- Wikidata
| View/Edit Human | View/Edit Mouse |

Transcriptional regulator Kaiso is a protein that in humans is encoded by the ZBTB33 gene. This gene encodes a transcriptional regulator with bimodal DNA-binding specificity, which binds to methylated CGCG and also to the non-methylated consensus KAISO-binding site TCCTGCNA. The protein contains an N-terminal POZ/BTB domain and 3 C-terminal zinc finger motifs. It recruits the N-CoR repressor complex to promote histone deacetylation and the formation of repressive chromatin structures in target gene promoters. It may contribute to the repression of target genes of the Wnt signaling pathway, and may also activate transcription of a subset of target genes by the recruitment of catenin delta-2 (CTNND2). Its interaction with catenin delta-1 (CTNND1) inhibits binding to both methylated and non-methylated DNA. It also interacts directly with the nuclear import receptor Importin-α2 (also known as karyopherin alpha2 or RAG cohort 1), which may mediate nuclear import of this protein. Alternatively spliced transcript variants encoding the same protein have been identified.

Named by Dr.Juliet Daniel, the KAISO gene was named after 'calypso' music popular in the Caribbeans, Trinidad & Tobago, e.t.c.

== Interactions ==
ZBTB33 has been shown to interact with HDAC3, Nuclear receptor co-repressor 1 and CTNND1.
