= TRIM27 =

Protein-coding gene in the species Homo sapiens

Identifiers
- Aliases: TRIM27, RFP, RNF76, tripartite motif containing 27
- External IDs: OMIM: 602165; MGI: 97904; GeneCards: TRIM27
Enzyme activity
EC #	BRENDA	ExPASy	KEGG	MetaCyc
2.3.2.27	↗	↗	↗	↗

Gene location (Human)
Chr.	Chromosome 6 (human)
Band	6p22.1	Start	28,903,002 bp
Band	6p22.1	End	28,923,988 bp

Gene location (Mouse)
Chr.	Chromosome 13 (mouse)
Band	13 A3.1|13 7.67 cM	Start	21,363,615 bp
Band	13 A3.1|13 7.67 cM	End	21,378,894 bp
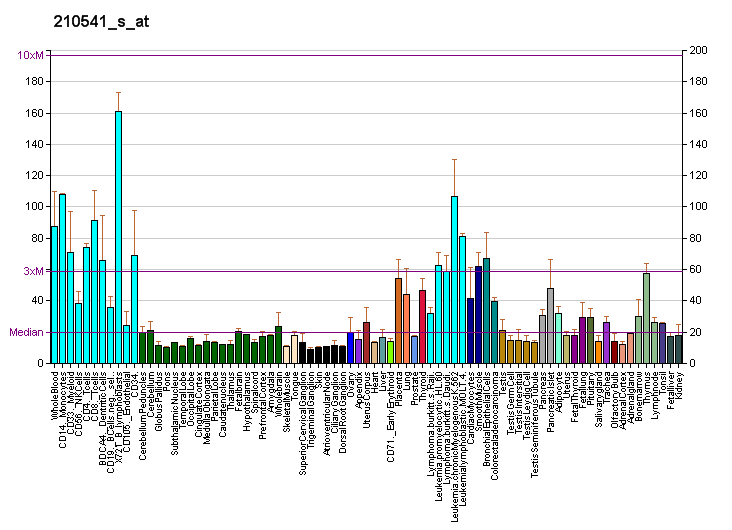

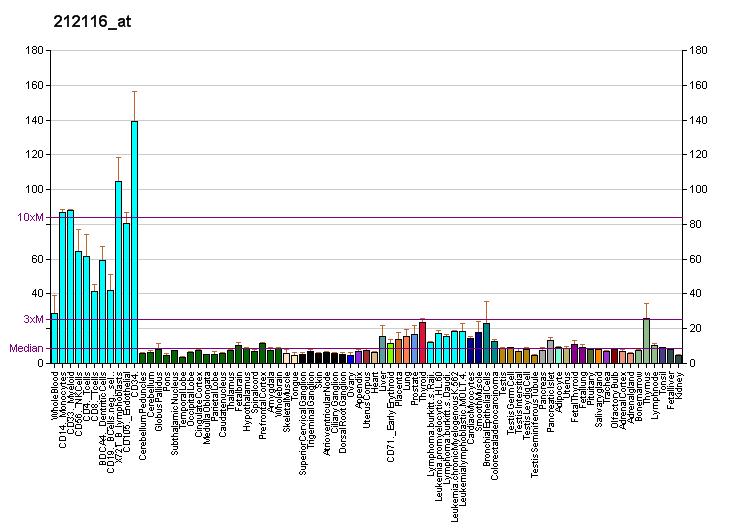

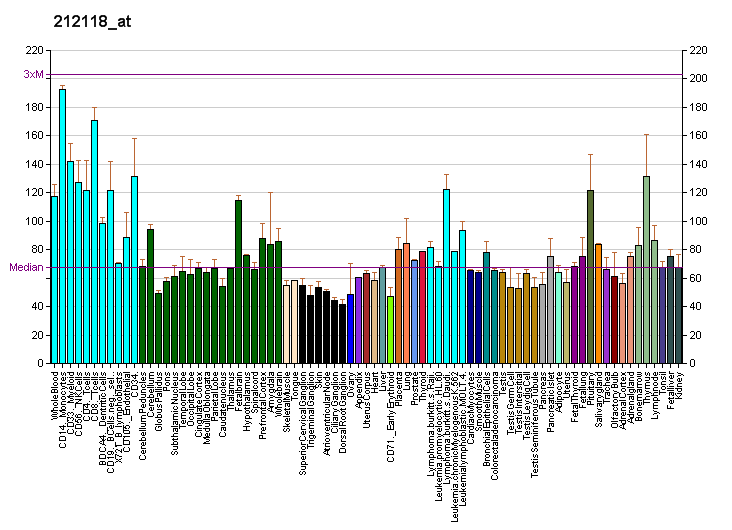
RNA expression pattern
Bgee	Human / Mouse (ortholog); Top expressed in: right uterine tube; body of pancreas; right lobe of liver; endometrium; canal of the cervix; blood; spleen; pituitary gland; anterior pituitary; granulocyte / Top expressed in: internal carotid artery; Paneth cell; external carotid artery; condyle; fossa; primary oocyte; Rostral migratory stream; spermatid; primitive streak; lacrimal gland; More reference expression data
BioGPS	More reference expression data
Gene ontology
Molecular function	DNA binding; zinc ion binding; metal ion binding; ubiquitin-protein transferase activity; protein binding; nucleic acid binding; transmembrane receptor protein tyrosine kinase activity; identical protein binding; transferase activity; ubiquitin protein ligase activity; SUMO transferase activity
Cellular component	cytoplasm; endosome; PML body; nuclear membrane; membrane; integral component of plasma membrane; intracellular anatomical structure; nucleoplasm; retromer complex; early endosome; nucleus; fibrillar center; nucleolus; cytosol
Biological process	regulation of transcription, DNA-templated; negative regulation of adaptive immune response; negative regulation of protein kinase activity; protein K63-linked ubiquitination; protein trimerization; positive regulation of DNA-binding transcription factor activity; transcription, DNA-templated; negative regulation of calcium ion import; negative regulation of gene expression, epigenetic; retrograde transport, endosome to Golgi; spermatogenesis; Arp2/3 complex-mediated actin nucleation; negative regulation of tumor necrosis factor production; cell population proliferation; peptidyl-tyrosine phosphorylation; negative regulation of transcription by RNA polymerase II; negative regulation of viral transcription; innate immune response; positive regulation of actin nucleation; protein sumoylation
Sources:Amigo / QuickGO
Orthologs
Databases	NCBI: entry; OMA: entry
Species	Human	Mouse
Entrez	5987	19720
Ensembl	ENSG00000229006; ENSG00000233948; ENSG00000204713; ENSG00000215641; ENSG00000237071 ENSG00000237462; ENSG00000234495	ENSMUSG00000021326
UniProt	P14373	Q62158
RefSeq (mRNA)	NM_030950; NM_006510	NM_009054
RefSeq (protein)	NP_006501	NP_033080
Location (UCSC)	Chr 6: 28.9 – 28.92 Mb	Chr 13: 21.36 – 21.38 Mb
PubMed search
- Wikidata
View/Edit Human	View/Edit Mouse

Zinc finger protein RFP is a protein that in humans is encoded by the TRIM27 gene.

This gene encodes a member of the tripartite motif (TRIM) family. The TRIM motif includes three zinc-binding domains, a RING, a B-box type 1 and a B-box type 2, and a coiled-coil region. This protein localizes to the nuclear matrix. It interacts with the enhancer of polycomb protein and represses gene transcription. It is also thought to be involved in the differentiation of male germ cells. Fusion of the N-terminus of this protein with the truncated C-terminus of the RET gene product has been shown to result in production of the ret transforming protein.

== Interactions ==
TRIM27 has been shown to interact with PRAM1 and EIF3S6.
