= USP7 =

Protein-coding gene in humans

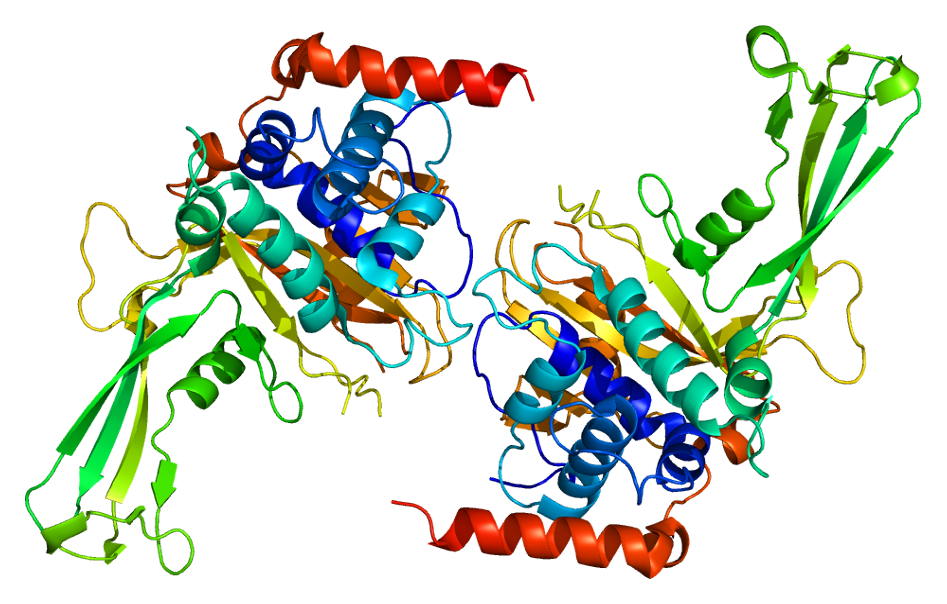

Identifiers
- Aliases: USP7, HAUSP, TEF1, ubiquitin specific peptidase 7 (herpes virus-associated), ubiquitin specific peptidase 7, HAFOUS
- External IDs: OMIM: 602519; MGI: 2182061; GeneCards: USP7
Available structures
PDB	Ortholog search: PDBe RCSB
PDB	List of PDB id codes 1NB8, 1NBF, 1YY6, 1YZE, 2F1W, 2F1X, 2F1Y, 2F1Z, 2FOJ, 2FOO, 2FOP, 2KVR, 2XXN, 2YLM, 3MQR, 3MQS, 4JJQ, 4KG9, 4M5W, 4M5X, 4PYZ, 4WPH, 4WPI, 4YOC, 5C56, 5C6D, 4YSI, 5FWI
Enzyme activity
EC #	BRENDA	ExPASy	KEGG	MetaCyc
3.4.19.12	↗	↗	↗	↗

Gene location (Human)
Chr.	Chromosome 16 (human)
Band	16p13.2	Start	8,892,097 bp
Band	16p13.2	End	8,975,328 bp

Gene location (Mouse)
Chr.	Chromosome 16 (mouse)
Band	16|16 A1	Start	8,507,459 bp
Band	16|16 A1	End	8,610,172 bp
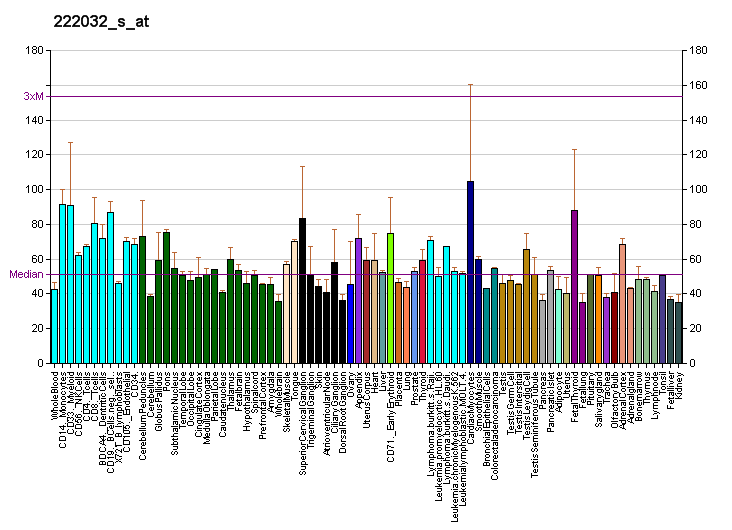

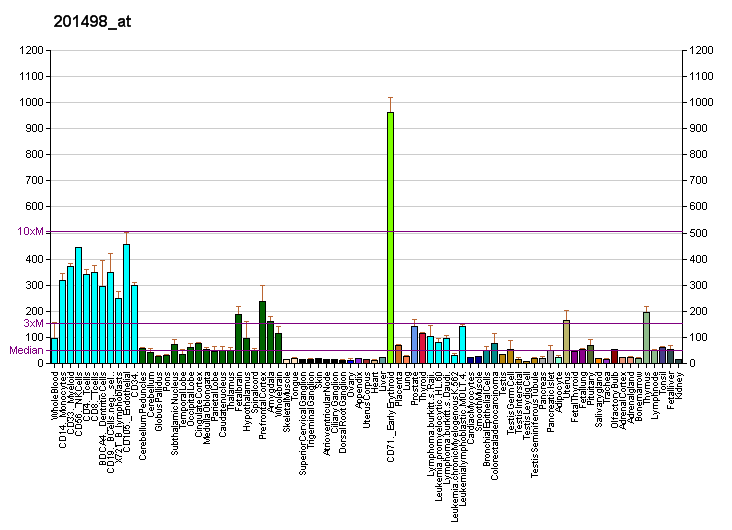

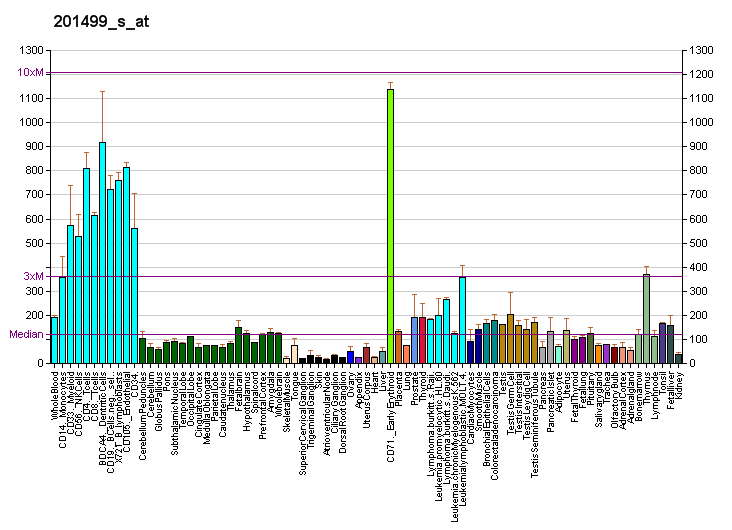
RNA expression pattern
Bgee	Human / Mouse (ortholog); Top expressed in: Brodmann area 23; middle temporal gyrus; Achilles tendon; epithelium of colon; ventricular zone; rectum; skin of leg; skin of abdomen; secondary oocyte; ganglionic eminence / Top expressed in: renal corpuscle; medullary collecting duct; ureter; fetal liver hematopoietic progenitor cell; primary oocyte; Paneth cell; human fetus; mesenteric lymph nodes; substantia nigra; secondary oocyte; More reference expression data
BioGPS	More reference expression data
Gene ontology
Molecular function	cysteine-type peptidase activity; p53 binding; transcription factor binding; peptidase activity; protein C-terminus binding; protein binding; thiol-dependent deubiquitinase; cysteine-type endopeptidase activity; hydrolase activity; ubiquitin protein ligase binding; deubiquitinase activity; Lys48-specific deubiquitinase activity
Cellular component	cytoplasm; PML body; nuclear body; nucleoplasm; nucleus; cytosol; chromosome; protein-containing complex
Biological process	maintenance of DNA methylation; ubiquitin-dependent protein catabolic process; protein stabilization; proteolysis; cellular response to DNA damage stimulus; multicellular organism development; regulation of DNA-binding transcription factor activity; regulation of telomere capping; transcription-coupled nucleotide-excision repair; viral process; negative regulation of NF-kappaB transcription factor activity; DNA repair; protein ubiquitination; protein deubiquitination; monoubiquitinated protein deubiquitination; histone H2B conserved C-terminal lysine deubiquitination; regulation of protein stability; negative regulation of proteasomal ubiquitin-dependent protein catabolic process; protein K48-linked deubiquitination; positive regulation of DNA demethylation; regulation of circadian rhythm; rhythmic process
Sources:Amigo / QuickGO
Orthologs
Databases	NCBI: entry; OMA: entry
Species	Human	Mouse
Entrez	7874	252870
Ensembl	ENSG00000187555	ENSMUSG00000022710
UniProt	Q93009	Q6A4J8
RefSeq (mRNA)	NM_003470; NM_001286457; NM_001286458; NM_001321858	NM_001003918
RefSeq (protein)	NP_001273386; NP_001273387; NP_001308787; NP_003461	NP_001003918
Location (UCSC)	Chr 16: 8.89 – 8.98 Mb	Chr 16: 8.51 – 8.61 Mb
PubMed search
- Wikidata
View/Edit Human	View/Edit Mouse

Ubiquitin-specific-processing protease 7 (USP7), also known as ubiquitin carboxyl-terminal hydrolase 7 or herpesvirus-associated ubiquitin-specific protease (HAUSP), is an enzyme that in humans is encoded by the USP7 gene.

== Function ==
=== Regulation of the p53 tumor suppressor ===
USP7 or HAUSP is a ubiquitin specific protease or a deubiquitylating enzyme that cleaves ubiquitin from its substrates. Since ubiquitylation (polyubiquitination) is most commonly associated with the stability and degradation of cellular proteins, HAUSP activity generally stabilizes its substrate proteins.

HAUSP is most popularly known as a direct antagonist of Mdm2, the E3 ubiquitin ligase for the tumor suppressor protein, p53. Normally, p53 levels are kept low in part due to Mdm2-mediated ubiquitylation and degradation of p53. In response to oncogenic insults, HAUSP can deubiquitinate p53 and protect p53 from Mdm2-mediated degradation, indicating that it may possess a tumor suppressor function for the immediate stabilization of p53 in response to stress.

Another important role of HAUSP function involves the oncogenic stabilization of p53. Oncogenes such as Myc and E1A are thought to activate p53 through a p19 alternative reading frame (p19ARF, also called ARF)-dependent pathway, although some evidence suggests ARF is not essential in this process. A possibility is that HAUSP provides an alternative pathway for safeguarding the cell against oncogenic insults.

=== Role in transcriptional regulation ===
USP7 can deubiquitinate histone H2B and this activity is associated with gene silencing in Drosophila. USP7 associates with a metabolic enzyme, GMP synthetase (GMPS) and this association stimulates USP7 deubiquitinase activity towards H2B. The USP7-GMPS complex is recruited to the polycomb (Pc) region in Drosophila and contributes to epigenetic silencing of homeotic genes. USP7 also controls histone H2A monoubiquitylation (H2AK119ub1), known to repress gene expression, by noncanonical Polycomb-repressive complexes (ncPRC1s).

=== Role in drug addiction ===
USP7, in conjunction with the scaffold protein Maged1, mediates the monoubiquitination of histone H2A in the paraventricular thalamus, a non-canonical reward region of the brain. This modification is significantly increased in response to chronic cocaine use, contributing to cocaine-adaptive behaviors and transcriptional repression in mice. Furthermore, genetic variations in MAGED1 and USP7 are associated with altered susceptibility to cocaine addiction and cocaine-induced behaviors in humans. These findings reveal an important epigenetic mechanism involving USP7 that regulates the risk and behavioral response to cocaine addiction, positioning USP7 as a potential therapeutic target for cocaine use disorder.

== Association with herpesviruses ==
USP7 was originally identified as a protein associated with the ICP0 protein of herpes simplex virus (HSV), hence the name Herpesvirus Associated USP (HAUSP). ICP0 is an E3-ubiquitin ligase that is involved in ubiquitination and subsequent degradation of itself and certain cellular proteins. USP7 has been shown to regulate the auto-ubiquitination and degradation of ICP0.

More recently, an interaction between USP7 and the EBNA1 protein of Epstein–Barr virus (EBV) (another herpesvirus) was also discovered. This interaction is particularly interesting given the oncogenic potential (potential to cause cancer) of EBV, which is associated with several human cancers. EBNA1 can compete with p53 for binding USP7. Stabilization by USP7 is important for the tumor suppressor function of p53. In cells, EBNA1 can sequester USP7 from p53 and thus attenuate stabilization of p53, rendering the cells predisposed to turning cancerous. Compromising the function of p53 by sequestering USP7 is one way EBNA1 can contribute to the oncogenic potential of EBV. Additionally, human USP7 was also shown to form a complex with GMPS and this complex is recruited to EBV genome sequences. USP7 was shown to be important for histone H2B deubiquitination in human cells and for deubiquitination of histone H2B incorporated in the EBV genome. Thus USP7 may also be important for regulation of viral gene expression.

The fact that viral proteins have evolved so as to target USP7, underscores the significance of USP7 in tumor suppression and other cellular processes.

== Binding partners ==
The following is a list of some of the known cellular binding partners of USP7/HAUSP:

- p53
- Mdm2
- Mdm4/MdmX
- FOXO4
- Daxx
- PTEN
- March7
- UVSSA

== Interactions ==
USP7 has been shown to interact with Ataxin 1, CLSPN, P53, and more recently with MAGED1 and histone H2A through its function in the polycomb repressive complex. A proteomic screen conducted to identify interacting partners of 75 human deubiquitinating enzymes (DUBs) has revealed several novel binding partners of USP7.

== Clinical significance ==
Loss-of-function mutations of USP7 are associated with neurodevelopmental disorder, called Hao-Fountain Syndrome, whose symptoms include developmental delay/intellectual disability, autism spectrum disorder, increased prevalence of epilepsy, abnormal brain MRIs, and speech/motor impairments, with some patients being completely non-verbal.

USP7 can be used as a senolytic agent due to ubiquitination and subsequent proteasome degradation of mdm2, thereby increasing p53 activity.
