= DACH2 =

Protein-coding gene in humans

Identifiers
- Aliases: DACH2, dachshund family transcription factor 2
- External IDs: OMIM: 300608; MGI: 1890446; HomoloGene: 33472; GeneCards: DACH2; OMA:DACH2 - orthologs

Gene location (Human)
Chr.	X chromosome (human)
Band	Xq21.2	Start	86,148,451 bp
Band	Xq21.2	End	86,832,604 bp

Gene location (Mouse)
Chr.	X chromosome (mouse)
Band	X E1|X 49.13 cM	Start	112,207,207 bp
Band	X E1|X 49.13 cM	End	112,746,083 bp
RNA expression pattern
Bgee	Human / Mouse (ortholog); Top expressed in: endothelial cell; Brodmann area 23; middle temporal gyrus; entorhinal cortex; superior frontal gyrus; postcentral gyrus; nucleus accumbens; ventricular zone; hippocampus proper; prefrontal cortex / Top expressed in: vas deferens; vestibular membrane of cochlear duct; saccule; otic vesicle; genital tubercle; digastric muscle; vestibular sensory epithelium; iris; medial ganglionic eminence; urachus; More reference expression data
BioGPS	n/a
Gene ontology
Molecular function	DNA binding; DNA-binding transcription factor activity, RNA polymerase II-specific; RNA polymerase II general transcription initiation factor activity
Cellular component	nucleus; transcription regulator complex
Biological process	development of primary female sexual characteristics; transcription, DNA-templated; regulation of transcription, DNA-templated; multicellular organism development; RNA polymerase II preinitiation complex assembly; regulation of transcription by RNA polymerase II; transcription by RNA polymerase II
Sources:Amigo / QuickGO
Orthologs
Species	Human	Mouse
Entrez	117154	93837
Ensembl	ENSG00000126733	ENSMUSG00000025592
UniProt	Q96NX9	Q925Q8
RefSeq (mRNA)	NM_001139514; NM_001139515; NM_053281	NM_001142570; NM_001289732; NM_001289733; NM_001289734; NM_033605
RefSeq (protein)	NP_001132986; NP_001132987; NP_444511	NP_001136042; NP_001276661; NP_001276662; NP_001276663; NP_291083
Location (UCSC)	Chr X: 86.15 – 86.83 Mb	Chr X: 112.21 – 112.75 Mb
PubMed search
- Wikidata
View/Edit Human	View/Edit Mouse

Dachshund homolog 2 is a protein that in humans is encoded by the DACH2 gene.

== Function ==
This gene is one of two genes which encode a protein similar to the Drosophila protein dachshund, a transcription factor involved in cell fate determination in the eye, limb and genital disc of the fly. The encoded protein contains two characteristic dachshund domains: an N-terminal domain responsible for DNA binding and a C-terminal domain responsible for protein-protein interactions. This gene is located on the X chromosome and is subject to inactivation by DNA methylation. The encoded protein may be involved in the regulation of organogenesis and myogenesis, and may play a role in premature ovarian failure.
