= MAGEA2 =

Protein-coding gene in humans

Identifiers
- Aliases: MAGEA2, CT1.2, MAGE2, MAGEA2A, MAGE family member A2
- External IDs: OMIM: 300173; GeneCards: MAGEA2

Gene location (Human)
Chr.	X chromosome (human)
Band	Xq28	Start	152,749,863 bp
Band	Xq28	End	152,753,884 bp
RNA expression pattern
Bgee	Human / Mouse (ortholog); Top expressed in: testicle; gonad; right testis; left testis; sural nerve; placenta; muscle of thigh; prefrontal cortex; olfactory zone of nasal mucosa; endometrium / n/a; More reference expression data
BioGPS	n/a
Gene ontology
Molecular function	histone deacetylase binding; protein binding; ubiquitin protein ligase binding
Cellular component	PML body; nucleus
Biological process	signal transduction by p53 class mediator; cellular senescence; negative regulation of protein sumoylation; regulation of transcription, DNA-templated; negative regulation of transcription by RNA polymerase II; positive regulation of ubiquitin-protein transferase activity; transcription, DNA-templated; negative regulation of protein acetylation
Sources:Amigo / QuickGO
Orthologs
Databases	NCBI: entry; OMA: entry
Species	Human	Mouse
Entrez	4101	n/a
Ensembl	ENSG00000268606	n/a
UniProt	P43356	n/a
RefSeq (mRNA)	NM_001282501; NM_001282502; NM_001282504; NM_001282505; NM_005361 NM_175742; NM_175743; NM_001386130	n/a
RefSeq (protein)	NP_001269430; NP_001269431; NP_001269433; NP_001269434; NP_005352 NP_786884; NP_786885	n/a
Location (UCSC)	Chr X: 152.75 – 152.75 Mb	n/a
PubMed search		n/a
- Wikidata
View/Edit Human

Melanoma-associated antigen 2 is a protein that in humans is encoded by the MAGEA2 gene.

This gene is a member of the MAGEA gene family. The members of this family encode proteins with 50 to 80% sequence identity to each other. The promoters and first exons of the MAGEA genes show considerable variability, suggesting that the existence of this gene family enables the same function to be expressed under different transcriptional controls. The MAGEA genes are clustered at chromosomal location Xq28. They have been implicated in some hereditary disorders, such as dyskeratosis congenita. This gene has two identical copies at different loci. Alternatively spliced transcript variants encoding the same protein have been identified for this gene.
