= TAF7L =

Protein-coding gene in the species Homo sapiens

Identifiers
- Aliases: TAF7L, CT40, TAF2Q, TATA-box binding protein associated factor 7 like
- External IDs: OMIM: 300314; MGI: 1921719; HomoloGene: 83311; GeneCards: TAF7L; OMA:TAF7L - orthologs

Gene location (Human)
Chr.	X chromosome (human)
Band	Xq22.1	Start	101,268,253 bp
Band	Xq22.1	End	101,293,057 bp

Gene location (Mouse)
Chr.	X chromosome (mouse)
Band	X|X E3	Start	133,360,867 bp
Band	X|X E3	End	133,377,239 bp
RNA expression pattern
Bgee	Human / Mouse (ortholog); Top expressed in: right testis; left testis; gonad; testicle; stromal cell of endometrium; canal of the cervix; nucleus accumbens; skin of leg; right lobe of liver; seminal vesicula / Top expressed in: spermatid; seminiferous tubule; spermatocyte; embryo; decidua; embryo; Gonadal ridge; ovary; primary visual cortex; superior frontal gyrus; More reference expression data
BioGPS	n/a
Gene ontology
Molecular function	transcription coactivator activity; transcription factor binding; histone acetyltransferase binding; molecular function
Cellular component	cytoplasm; transcription factor TFIID complex; nucleus
Biological process	regulation of transcription by RNA polymerase II; multicellular organism development; cell differentiation; RNA polymerase II preinitiation complex assembly; transcription initiation from RNA polymerase II promoter; regulation of transcription, DNA-templated; spermatogenesis; transcription, DNA-templated; biological process; positive regulation of nucleic acid-templated transcription
Sources:Amigo / QuickGO
Orthologs
Species	Human	Mouse
Entrez	54457	74469
Ensembl	ENSG00000102387	ENSMUSG00000009596
UniProt	Q5H9L4	Q9D3R9
RefSeq (mRNA)	NM_001168474; NM_024885	NM_028958
RefSeq (protein)	NP_001161946; NP_079161	NP_083234
Location (UCSC)	Chr X: 101.27 – 101.29 Mb	Chr X: 133.36 – 133.38 Mb
PubMed search
- Wikidata
View/Edit Human	View/Edit Mouse

TATA-box binding protein associated factor 7 like is a protein that in humans is encoded by the TAF7L gene.

== Function ==
This gene is similar to a mouse gene that encodes a TATA box binding protein-associated factor, and shows testis-specific expression. The encoded protein could be a spermatogenesis-specific component of the DNA-binding general transcription factor complex TFIID. Alternatively spliced transcript variants encoding different isoforms have been found for this gene. [provided by RefSeq, Dec 2009].
