= SPANXN1 =

Protein-coding gene in the species Homo sapiens

Identifiers
- Aliases: SPANXN1, CT11.6, SPANX family member N1
- External IDs: OMIM: 300664; GeneCards: SPANXN1

Gene location (Human)
Chr.	X chromosome (human)
Band	Xq27.3	Start	145,247,503 bp
Band	Xq27.3	End	145,256,208 bp
RNA expression pattern
Bgee	Human / Mouse (ortholog); Top expressed in: testicle; gonad; right testis; left testis / n/a; More reference expression data
BioGPS	n/a
Orthologs
Databases	NCBI: entry; OMA: entry
Species	Human	Mouse
Entrez	494118	n/a
Ensembl	ENSG00000203923	n/a
UniProt	Q5VSR9	n/a
RefSeq (mRNA)	NM_001009614	n/a
RefSeq (protein)	NP_001009614	n/a
Location (UCSC)	Chr X: 145.25 – 145.26 Mb	n/a
PubMed search		n/a
- Wikidata
View/Edit Human

SPANX family member N1 is a protein that in humans is encoded by the SPANXN1 gene.

== Function ==
This gene represents one of several duplicated family members that are located on chromosome X. This gene family encodes proteins that play a role in spermiogenesis. These proteins represent a specific subgroup of cancer/testis-associated antigens, and they may be candidates for tumor vaccines. This family member belongs to a subgroup of related genes that are present in all primates and rats and mice, and thus, it represents one of the ancestral family members.
