= ITM2A =

Protein-coding gene in the species Homo sapiens

Identifiers
- Aliases: ITM2A, BRICD2A, E25A, integral membrane protein 2A
- External IDs: OMIM: 300222; MGI: 107706; GeneCards: ITM2A

Gene location (Human)
Chr.	X chromosome (human)
Band	Xq21.1	Start	79,360,384 bp
Band	Xq21.1	End	79,367,667 bp

Gene location (Mouse)
Chr.	X chromosome (mouse)
Band	X|X D	Start	106,440,705 bp
Band	X|X D	End	106,446,982 bp
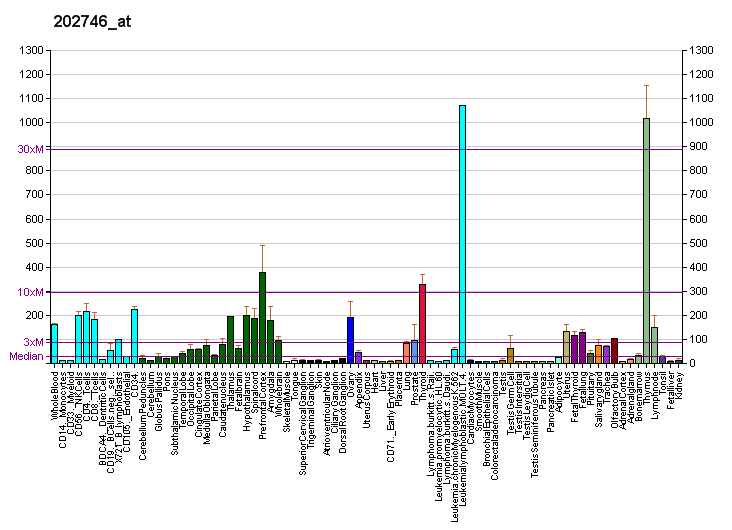

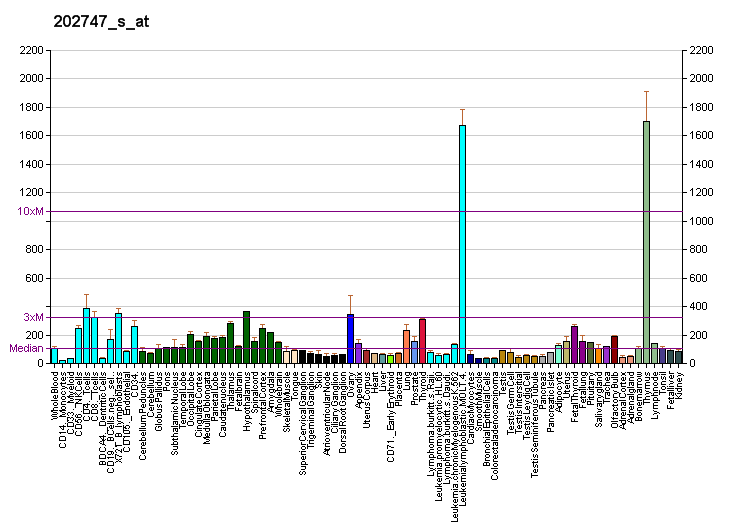
RNA expression pattern
Bgee	Human / Mouse (ortholog); Top expressed in: thymus; cartilage tissue; vena cava; subthalamic nucleus; internal globus pallidus; lateral nuclear group of thalamus; inferior ganglion of vagus nerve; lactiferous duct; ventral tegmental area; Epithelium of choroid plexus / Top expressed in: calvaria; efferent ductule; condyle; fossa; human fetus; dermis; vas deferens; umbilical cord; endocardial cushion; Gonadal ridge; More reference expression data
BioGPS	More reference expression data
Gene ontology
Molecular function	protein binding; amyloid-beta binding
Cellular component	membrane; integral component of membrane; Golgi apparatus; plasma membrane; extracellular exosome
Biological process	plasma cell differentiation; immunoglobulin production; nervous system development; negative regulation of amyloid precursor protein biosynthetic process
Sources:Amigo / QuickGO
Orthologs
Databases	NCBI: entry; OMA: entry
Species	Human	Mouse
Entrez	9452	16431
Ensembl	ENSG00000078596	ENSMUSG00000031239
UniProt	O43736	Q61500
RefSeq (mRNA)	NM_004867; NM_001171581	NM_008409
RefSeq (protein)	NP_001165052; NP_004858	NP_032435
Location (UCSC)	Chr X: 79.36 – 79.37 Mb	Chr X: 106.44 – 106.45 Mb
PubMed search
- Wikidata
View/Edit Human	View/Edit Mouse

Integral membrane protein 2A is a protein that in humans is encoded by the ITM2A gene.

== Function ==
The protein encoded by this gene is involved in osteo- and chondrogenic cellular differentiation (the cells which are responsible for the development of bone and cartilage respectively).

ITM2A is also involved in activation of T-cells in the immune system and in myocyte differentiation.
