= FAM120C =

Protein-coding gene in the species Homo sapiens

Identifiers
- Aliases: FAM120C, CXorf17, ORF34, family with sequence similarity 120C
- External IDs: OMIM: 300741; MGI: 2387687; GeneCards: FAM120C

Gene location (Human)
Chr.	X chromosome (human)
Band	Xp11.22	Start	54,068,324 bp
Band	Xp11.22	End	54,183,281 bp

Gene location (Mouse)
Chr.	X chromosome (mouse)
Band	X|X F3	Start	150,127,171 bp
Band	X|X F3	End	150,254,838 bp
RNA expression pattern
Bgee	Human / Mouse (ortholog); Top expressed in: inferior ganglion of vagus nerve; ventral tegmental area; internal globus pallidus; subthalamic nucleus; superior vestibular nucleus; pars reticulata; cerebellar vermis; mucosa of paranasal sinus; trigeminal ganglion; gonad / Top expressed in: arcuate nucleus; paraventricular nucleus of hypothalamus; suprachiasmatic nucleus; dorsomedial hypothalamic nucleus; interventricular septum; median eminence; ventral tegmental area; central gray substance of midbrain; habenula; olfactory tubercle; More reference expression data
BioGPS	n/a
Orthologs
Databases	NCBI: entry; OMA: entry
Species	Human	Mouse
Entrez	54954	207375
Ensembl	ENSG00000184083	ENSMUSG00000025262
UniProt	Q9NX05	Q8C3F2
RefSeq (mRNA)	NM_001300788; NM_017848; NM_198456	NM_198105
RefSeq (protein)	NP_001287717; NP_060318; NP_940858	NP_932773
Location (UCSC)	Chr X: 54.07 – 54.18 Mb	Chr X: 150.13 – 150.25 Mb
PubMed search
- Wikidata
View/Edit Human	View/Edit Mouse

FAM120C (Family with sequence similarity 120C) is a protein-coding gene in humans that encodes for constitutive coactivator of PPAR-gamma-like protein 2. It belongs to the FAM120 gene family, which includes two other human paralogs: FAM120A and FAM120B.

This gene encodes a potential transmembrane protein and lies in a region where mutations and deletions have been associated with intellectual disability and autism. Alternative splicing results in multiple transcript variants. [provided by RefSeq, Aug 2011].

== Gene ==
The FAM120C gene is located on the X chromosome and contains 18 exons. It is located on the reverse strand and spans 114,931 base pairs.

== Transcript ==
FAM120C undergoes alternative splicing to form 3 distinct transcripts.

Transcript 1: This is the longest transcript variant and encodes the longest isoform. It is composed of exons 1-16.

Transcript 2: This is the shortest transcript variant and encodes the shortest isoform. It is composed of exons 1 and 2B. The alternative exon 2B is derived from a MLT1E repeat in intron 1.

Transcript 3: This transcript is composed of exons 1-11 and 14-16. The exclusion of exons 12 and 13 results in a frameshift relative to transcript 1.

== Protein ==
The FAM120C gene encodes for constitutive coactivator of PPAR-gamma-like protein 2. There are 3 known isoforms of this protein.

Constitutive coactivator of PPAR-gamma-like protein 2 contains a PIN domain, a FAM120A/B/C helical domain, and two omega-N-methylarginine sites.

== Homologs ==
FAM120C has one known ortholog in mice, Fam120c.
