= VCF2 =

Protein-coding gene in humans

Identifiers
- Aliases: VCF2, CXorf44, family with sequence similarity 104 member B, FAM104B, VCP nuclear cofactor family member 2
- External IDs: GeneCards: VCF2

Gene location (Human)
Chr.	X chromosome (human)
Band	Xp11.21	Start	55,143,102 bp
Band	Xp11.21	End	55,161,310 bp
RNA expression pattern
Bgee	Human / Mouse (ortholog); Top expressed in: right uterine tube; olfactory zone of nasal mucosa; C1 segment; testicle; muscle of thigh; islet of Langerhans; ganglionic eminence; hypothalamus; cingulate gyrus; anterior cingulate cortex / n/a; More reference expression data
BioGPS	n/a
Orthologs
Databases	NCBI: entry; OMA: entry
Species	Human	Mouse
Entrez	90736	n/a
Ensembl	ENSG00000182518	n/a
UniProt	Q5XKR9	n/a
RefSeq (mRNA)	NM_001166699; NM_001166700; NM_001166701; NM_001166702; NM_001166703 NM_001166704; NM_138362	n/a
RefSeq (protein)	NP_001160171; NP_001160172; NP_001160173; NP_001160174; NP_001160175 NP_001160176; NP_612371	n/a
Location (UCSC)	Chr X: 55.14 – 55.16 Mb	n/a
PubMed search		n/a
- Wikidata
View/Edit Human

VCP nuclear cofactor family member 2 is a protein that in humans is encoded by the VCF2 gene (previously FAM104B). Not much has been reported about this protein's function, but it has a paralog: VCF1.
