= MIRLET7F2 =

Non-coding RNA in the species Homo sapiens

Identifiers
- Aliases: MIRLET7F2, LET7F2, MIRNLET7F2, let-7f-2, microRNA let-7f-2
- External IDs: OMIM: 300721; GeneCards: MIRLET7F2; OMA:MIRLET7F2 - orthologs

Gene location (Human)
Chr.	X chromosome (human)
Band	Xp11.22	Start	53,557,192 bp
Band	Xp11.22	End	53,557,274 bp
RNA expression pattern
Bgee	Human / Mouse (ortholog); Top expressed in: muscle of leg; heart; blood; stomach; lung; endometrium; intestine; right lobe of liver; upper lobe of left lung; body of stomach / n/a; More reference expression data
BioGPS	n/a
Orthologs
Species	Human	Mouse
Entrez	406889	n/a
Ensembl	ENSG00000208012	n/a
UniProt	n a	n/a
RefSeq (mRNA)	n/a	n/a
RefSeq (protein)	n/a	n/a
Location (UCSC)	Chr X: 53.56 – 53.56 Mb	n/a
PubMed search		n/a
- Wikidata
View/Edit Human

MicroRNA let-7f-2 is a non-coding RNA that in humans is encoded by the MIRLET7F2 gene.

== Function ==
microRNAs (miRNAs) are short (20-24 nt) non-coding RNAs that are involved in post-transcriptional regulation of gene expression in multicellular organisms by affecting both the stability and translation of mRNAs. miRNAs are transcribed by RNA polymerase II as part of capped and polyadenylated primary transcripts (pri-miRNAs) that can be either protein-coding or non-coding. The primary transcript is cleaved by the Drosha ribonuclease III enzyme to produce an approximately 70-nt stem-loop precursor miRNA (pre-miRNA), which is further cleaved by the cytoplasmic Dicer ribonuclease to generate the mature miRNA and antisense miRNA star (miRNA*) products.

The mature miRNA is incorporated into a RNA-induced silencing complex (RISC), which recognizes target mRNAs through imperfect base pairing with the miRNA and most commonly results in translational inhibition or destabilization of the target mRNA. The RefSeq represents the predicted microRNA stem-loop. [provided by RefSeq, Sep 2009].
