= Zinc finger protein 275 =

Protein found in humans

ZNF275

Identifiers
- Aliases: ZNF275, zinc finger protein 275
- External IDs: MGI: 1350985; GeneCards: ZNF275

Gene location (Human)
Chr.	X chromosome (human)
Band	Xq28	Start	153,334,147 bp
Band	Xq28	End	153,360,110 bp

Gene location (Mouse)
Chr.	X chromosome (mouse)
Band	X A7.3|X 37.29 cM	Start	72,386,227 bp
Band	X A7.3|X 37.29 cM	End	72,402,686 bp
RNA expression pattern
Bgee	Human / Mouse (ortholog); Top expressed in: adrenal cortex; right adrenal gland; left adrenal gland; left adrenal cortex; right adrenal cortex; tibia; mucosa of ileum; tibialis anterior muscle; pancreatic ductal cell; seminal vesicula / Top expressed in: vas deferens; Gonadal ridge; dermis; median eminence; efferent ductule; suprachiasmatic nucleus; mandibular prominence; maxillary prominence; calvaria; arcuate nucleus; More reference expression data
BioGPS	n/a
Gene ontology
Molecular function	DNA-binding transcription factor activity; DNA binding; metal ion binding; nucleic acid binding; DNA-binding transcription factor activity, RNA polymerase II-specific
Cellular component	nucleus
Biological process	regulation of transcription, DNA-templated; transcription, DNA-templated; regulation of transcription by RNA polymerase II
Sources:Amigo / QuickGO
Orthologs
Databases	NCBI: entry; OMA: entry
Species	Human	Mouse
Entrez	10838	27081
Ensembl	ENSG00000063587	ENSMUSG00000031365
UniProt	Q9NSD4	n/a
RefSeq (mRNA)	NM_001080485; NM_020636; NM_001367757	NM_001160229; NM_031494
RefSeq (protein)	NP_001073954; NP_001354686	n/a
Location (UCSC)	Chr X: 153.33 – 153.36 Mb	Chr X: 72.39 – 72.4 Mb
PubMed search
- Wikidata
View/Edit Human	View/Edit Mouse

Zinc finger protein 275 is a protein that in humans is encoded by the ZNF275 gene.

== Function ==
This gene encodes a zinc finger protein that appears to be conserved in eutheria. Its function has not yet been established.
