= Cancer/testis antigen family 45, member A5 =

Protein-coding gene in humans

CT45A5

Identifiers
- Aliases: CT45A5, CT45.5, CT455, cancer/testis antigen family 45, member A5, cancer/testis antigen family 45 member A5, CT45A3, CT45-3, CT45-6, CT45A7, CT45A6, CT45A4, CT45-4
- External IDs: OMIM: 300796; GeneCards: CT45A5

Gene location (Human)
Chr.	X chromosome (human)
Band	Xq26.3	Start	135,777,130 bp
Band	Xq26.3	End	135,785,298 bp
RNA expression pattern
Bgee	Human / Mouse (ortholog); Top expressed in: testicle; gonad; right testis; nucleus accumbens; left testis; hypothalamus; caudate nucleus; putamen; primary visual cortex; amygdala / n/a; More reference expression data
BioGPS	n/a
Orthologs
Databases	NCBI: entry; OMA: entry
Species	Human	Mouse
Entrez	441521	n/a
Ensembl	ENSG00000228836	n/a
UniProt	P0DMU7; P0DMU8; P0DMV0	n/a
RefSeq (mRNA)	NM_001007551; NM_001172288	n/a
RefSeq (protein)	NP_001017438; NP_001007552.2; NP_001017438.2; NP_001165759.2; NP_001278456.1 NP_001278457.1; NP_001278458.1; NP_001278459.1; NP_001278472.1; NP_001007552; NP_001165759; NP_001278472; NP_001278456; NP_001278457; NP_001278458; NP_001278459; NP_001007552.2; NP_001017438.2; NP_001165759.2; NP_001278472.1; NP_001007552; NP_001165759; NP_001278472	n/a
Location (UCSC)	Chr X: 135.78 – 135.79 Mb	n/a
PubMed search		n/a
- Wikidata
View/Edit Human

Cancer/testis antigen family 45, member A5 is a protein in humans that is encoded by the CT45A5 gene.

This gene represents one of a cluster of six similar genes located on the q arm of chromosome X. The genes in this cluster encode members of the cancer/testis (CT) family of antigens, and are distinct from other CT antigens. These antigens are thought to be novel therapeutic targets for human cancers. Alternative splicing results in multiple transcript variants. A related pseudogene has been identified on chromosome 5. [provided by RefSeq, May 2010].
