= PAGE2B =

Protein-coding gene in the species Homo sapiens

Identifiers
- Aliases: PAGE2B, CT16.5, GAGEE3, PAGE-2B, PAGE family member 2B
- External IDs: HomoloGene: 134183; GeneCards: PAGE2B; OMA:PAGE2B - orthologs

Gene location (Human)
Chr.	X chromosome (human)
Band	Xp11.21	Start	55,075,030 bp
Band	Xp11.21	End	55,078,909 bp
RNA expression pattern
Bgee	Human / Mouse (ortholog); Top expressed in: testicle; right testis; left testis; gonad; blood; monocyte; granulocyte; bone marrow; right uterine tube; spleen / n/a; More reference expression data
BioGPS	n/a
Orthologs
Species	Human	Mouse
Entrez	389860	n/a
Ensembl	ENSG00000238269	n/a
UniProt	Q5JRK9	n/a
RefSeq (mRNA)	NM_001015038	n/a
RefSeq (protein)	NP_001015038	n/a
Location (UCSC)	Chr X: 55.08 – 55.08 Mb	n/a
PubMed search		n/a
- Wikidata
View/Edit Human

PAGE family member 2B is a protein that in humans is encoded by the PAGE2B gene.
