= ZFP92 =

Mammalian protein found in Homo sapiens

Identifiers
- Aliases: ZFP92, ZNF897, ZFP92 zinc finger protein
- External IDs: MGI: 108094; GeneCards: ZFP92

Gene location (Human)
Chr.	X chromosome (human)
Band	Xq28	Start	153,418,322 bp
Band	Xq28	End	153,426,481 bp

Gene location (Mouse)
Chr.	X chromosome (mouse)
Band	X A7.3|X 37.31 cM	Start	72,454,702 bp
Band	X A7.3|X 37.31 cM	End	72,471,991 bp
RNA expression pattern
Bgee	Human / Mouse (ortholog); Top expressed in: gonad; Brodmann area 23; lower lobe of lung; germinal epithelium; cardia; entorhinal cortex; superior frontal gyrus; caput epididymis; postcentral gyrus; ventral tegmental area / Top expressed in: zygote; secondary oocyte; urethra; male urethra; supraoptic nucleus; primary oocyte; neuron; dentate gyrus of hippocampal formation granule cell; lip; preoptic area; More reference expression data
BioGPS	n/a
Gene ontology
Molecular function	DNA binding; metal ion binding; nucleic acid binding; DNA-binding transcription factor activity, RNA polymerase II-specific
Cellular component	intracellular anatomical structure; nucleus
Biological process	regulation of transcription, DNA-templated; transcription, DNA-templated; regulation of transcription by RNA polymerase II
Sources:Amigo / QuickGO
Orthologs
Databases	NCBI: entry; OMA: entry
Species	Human	Mouse
Entrez	139735	22754
Ensembl	ENSG00000189420	ENSMUSG00000031374
UniProt	A6NM28	Q62396
RefSeq (mRNA)	NM_001136273	NM_009566; NM_001310531
RefSeq (protein)	NP_001129745	NP_001297460; NP_033592
Location (UCSC)	Chr X: 153.42 – 153.43 Mb	Chr X: 72.45 – 72.47 Mb
PubMed search
- Wikidata
View/Edit Human	View/Edit Mouse

ZFP92 zinc finger protein is a protein that in humans is encoded by the ZFP92 gene.
