= TCEAL4 =

Protein-coding gene in the species Homo sapiens

Identifiers
- Aliases: TCEAL4, NPD017, WEX7, transcription elongation factor A like 4
- External IDs: HomoloGene: 88900; GeneCards: TCEAL4; OMA:TCEAL4 - orthologs

Gene location (Human)
Chr.	X chromosome (human)
Band	Xq22.2	Start	103,576,231 bp
Band	Xq22.2	End	103,587,729 bp
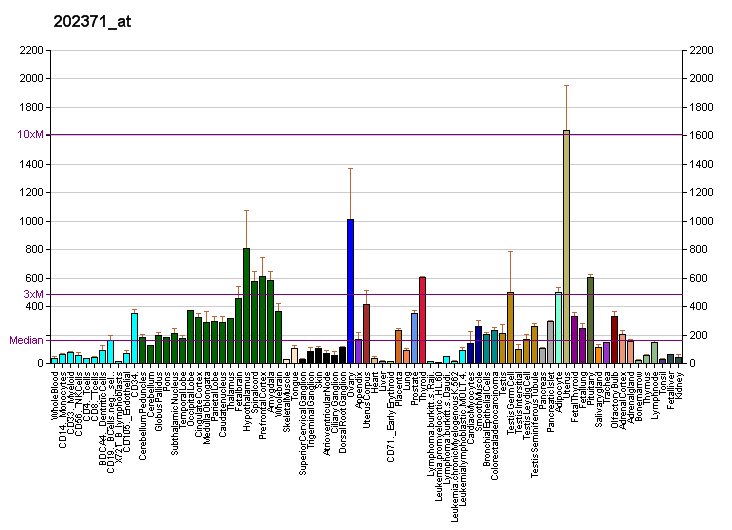
RNA expression pattern
Bgee	Human / Mouse (ortholog); Top expressed in: right ovary; left ovary; body of uterus; seminal vesicula; gastric mucosa; left uterine tube; myometrium; right coronary artery; canal of the cervix; Epithelium of choroid plexus / n/a; More reference expression data
BioGPS	More reference expression data
Gene ontology
Molecular function	WW domain binding
Cellular component	nucleus
Biological process	transcription, DNA-templated; regulation of transcription, DNA-templated; regulation of transcription by RNA polymerase II
Sources:Amigo / QuickGO
Orthologs
Species	Human	Mouse
Entrez	79921	n/a
Ensembl	ENSG00000133142	n/a
UniProt	Q96EI5	n/a
RefSeq (mRNA)	NM_001006935; NM_001006936; NM_001006937; NM_001300901; NM_001305840 NM_001305841; NM_001305842; NM_024863	n/a
RefSeq (protein)	NP_001006936; NP_001006938; NP_001287830; NP_001292769; NP_001292770 NP_001292771; NP_079139	n/a
Location (UCSC)	Chr X: 103.58 – 103.59 Mb	n/a
PubMed search		n/a
- Wikidata
View/Edit Human

Transcription elongation factor A protein-like 4 is a protein that in humans is encoded by the TCEAL4 gene.

This gene encodes a member of the transcription elongation factor A (SII)-like (TCEAL] gene family. Members of this family contain TFA domains and may function as nuclear phosphoproteins that modulate transcription in a promoter context-dependent manner. Multiple family members are located on the X chromosome. Alternative splicing occurs for this gene; however, the full-length nature of all transcript variants has not yet been described.
