= FMR1-AS1 =

Non-coding RNA in the species Homo sapiens

Identifiers
- Aliases: FMR1-AS1, ASFMR1, FMR1-AS, FMR1AS, FMR4, FMR1-AS1 gene, FMR1 antisense RNA 1, FMR1 antisense RNA 1 (head to head)
- External IDs: OMIM: 300805; GeneCards: FMR1-AS1

Gene location (Human)
Chr.	X chromosome (human)
Band	Xq27.3	Start	147,909,431 bp
Band	Xq27.3	End	147,911,817 bp
RNA expression pattern
Bgee	Human / Mouse (ortholog); Top expressed in: ventricular zone; ganglionic eminence; lymph node; liver; skeletal muscle tissue; duodenum; prefrontal cortex; gallbladder; blood; olfactory zone of nasal mucosa / n/a; More reference expression data
BioGPS	n/a
Orthologs
Databases	NCBI: entry; OMA: entry
Species	Human	Mouse
Entrez	100126270	n/a
Ensembl	ENSG00000268066	n/a
UniProt	n a	n/a
RefSeq (mRNA)	n/a	n/a
RefSeq (protein)	n/a	n/a
Location (UCSC)	Chr X: 147.91 – 147.91 Mb	n/a
PubMed search		n/a
- Wikidata
View/Edit Human

In molecular biology, FMR1 antisense RNA 1 (FMR1-AS1), also known as ASFMR1 or FMR4, is a long non-coding RNA. The FMR1-AS1 gene overlaps, and is antisense to, the CGG repeat region of the FMR1 gene. Its expression is upregulated in fragile X syndrome premutation carriers, and silenced in patients with fragile X syndrome. FMR1-AS1 has an anti-apoptotic function.

== See also ==
- Long noncoding RNA
