= FAM50A =

Protein-coding gene in the species Homo sapiens

Identifiers
- Aliases: FAM50A, 9F, DXS9928E, HXC-26, HXC26, XAP5, family with sequence similarity 50 member A, MRXSA
- External IDs: OMIM: 300453; MGI: 1351626; GeneCards: FAM50A

Gene location (Human)
Chr.	X chromosome (human)
Band	Xq28	Start	154,444,141 bp
Band	Xq28	End	154,450,654 bp

Gene location (Mouse)
Chr.	X chromosome (mouse)
Band	X|X A7.3	Start	73,356,639 bp
Band	X|X A7.3	End	73,363,755 bp
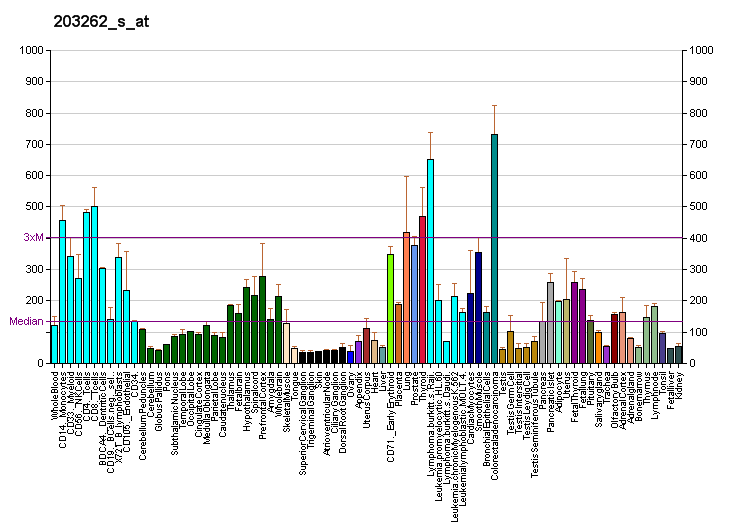
RNA expression pattern
Bgee	Human / Mouse (ortholog); Top expressed in: sural nerve; anterior pituitary; stromal cell of endometrium; tendon of biceps brachii; C1 segment; right lobe of thyroid gland; left lobe of thyroid gland; apex of heart; right hemisphere of cerebellum; muscle layer of sigmoid colon / Top expressed in: saccule; otic placode; otic vesicle; primary oocyte; neural layer of retina; zygote; endocardial cushion; morula; morula; granulocyte; More reference expression data
BioGPS	More reference expression data
Gene ontology
Molecular function	RNA binding
Cellular component	nucleus; nucleoplasm
Biological process	spermatogenesis
Sources:Amigo / QuickGO
Orthologs
Databases	NCBI: entry; OMA: entry
Species	Human	Mouse
Entrez	9130	108160
Ensembl	ENSG00000071859	ENSMUSG00000001962
UniProt	Q14320	Q9WV03
RefSeq (mRNA)	NM_004699	NM_138607
RefSeq (protein)	NP_004690	NP_613073
Location (UCSC)	Chr X: 154.44 – 154.45 Mb	Chr X: 73.36 – 73.36 Mb
PubMed search
- Wikidata
View/Edit Human	View/Edit Mouse

Protein FAM50A is a protein that in humans is encoded by the FAM50A gene.
