= MIR660 =

Non-coding RNA in humans

Identifiers
- Aliases: MIR660, MIRN660, hsa-mir-660, mir-660, microRNA 660
- External IDs: GeneCards: MIR660; OMA:MIR660 - orthologs

Gene location (Human)
Chr.	X chromosome (human)
Band	Xp11.23	Start	50,013,241 bp
Band	Xp11.23	End	50,013,337 bp
RNA expression pattern
Bgee	Human / Mouse (ortholog); Top expressed in: heart; gastrocnemius muscle; right auricle of heart; monocyte; body of pancreas; ascending aorta; tibial nerve; substantia nigra; colon; left adrenal cortex / n/a; More reference expression data
BioGPS	n/a
Orthologs
Species	Human	Mouse
Entrez	724030	n/a
Ensembl	ENSG00000207970	n/a
UniProt	n a	n/a
RefSeq (mRNA)	n/a	n/a
RefSeq (protein)	n/a	n/a
Location (UCSC)	Chr X: 50.01 – 50.01 Mb	n/a
PubMed search		n/a
- Wikidata
View/Edit Human

MicroRNA 660 is a miRNA that in humans is encoded by the MIR660 gene.

== Function ==
microRNAs (miRNAs) are short (20-24 nt) non-coding RNAs that are involved in post-transcriptional regulation of gene expression in multicellular organisms by affecting both the stability and translation of mRNAs. miRNAs are transcribed by RNA polymerase II as part of capped and polyadenylated primary transcripts (pri-miRNAs) that can be either protein-coding or non-coding. The primary transcript is cleaved by the Drosha ribonuclease III enzyme to produce an approximately 70-nt stem-loop precursor miRNA (pre-miRNA), which is further cleaved by the cytoplasmic Dicer ribonuclease to generate the mature miRNA and antisense miRNA star (miRNA*) products. The mature miRNA is incorporated into a RNA-induced silencing complex (RISC), which recognizes target mRNAs through imperfect base pairing with the miRNA and most commonly results in translational inhibition or destabilization of the target mRNA. The RefSeq represents the predicted microRNA stem-loop.
