= MAGED4B =

Protein-coding gene in humans

Identifiers
- Aliases: MAGED4B, MAGE family member D4B
- External IDs: OMIM: 300765; GeneCards: MAGED4B

Gene location (Human)
Chr.	X chromosome (human)
Band	Xp11.22	Start	52,061,827 bp
Band	Xp11.22	End	52,069,219 bp
RNA expression pattern
Bgee	Human / Mouse (ortholog); Top expressed in: ventricular zone; ganglionic eminence; pituitary gland; hypothalamus; anterior pituitary; nucleus accumbens; amygdala; caudate nucleus; putamen; hippocampus proper / n/a; More reference expression data
BioGPS	n/a
Orthologs
Databases	NCBI: entry; OMA: entry
Species	Human	Mouse
Entrez	81557	n/a
Ensembl	ENSG00000187243	n/a
UniProt	Q96JG8	n/a
RefSeq (mRNA)	NM_001242362; NM_030801; NM_177535; NM_177537	n/a
RefSeq (protein)	NP_001092270; NP_001258990; NP_001258991; NP_001258992	n/a
Location (UCSC)	Chr X: 52.06 – 52.07 Mb	n/a
PubMed search		n/a
- Wikidata
View/Edit Human

Melanoma-associated antigen D4 is a protein that in humans is encoded by the MAGED4B gene.

This gene is related to members of the MAGED gene family, in terms of the sequence similarity and the chromosome location. This gene is expressed only in brain and ovary among normal tissues, and two transcript variants of this gene are specifically expressed in glioma cells among cancer cells. This gene and the other MAGED genes are clustered on chromosome Xp11. Multiple alternatively spliced transcript variants have been found for this gene, however, the full length nature of some variants has not been defined.
