= MORF4L2 =

Protein-coding gene in the species Homo sapiens

Identifiers
- Aliases: MORF4L2, MORFL2, MRGX, mortality factor 4 like 2
- External IDs: OMIM: 300409; MGI: 1927167; GeneCards: MORF4L2

Gene location (Human)
Chr.	X chromosome (human)
Band	Xq22.2	Start	103,675,496 bp
Band	Xq22.2	End	103,688,158 bp

Gene location (Mouse)
Chr.	X chromosome (mouse)
Band	X|X F1	Start	135,633,691 bp
Band	X|X F1	End	135,644,439 bp
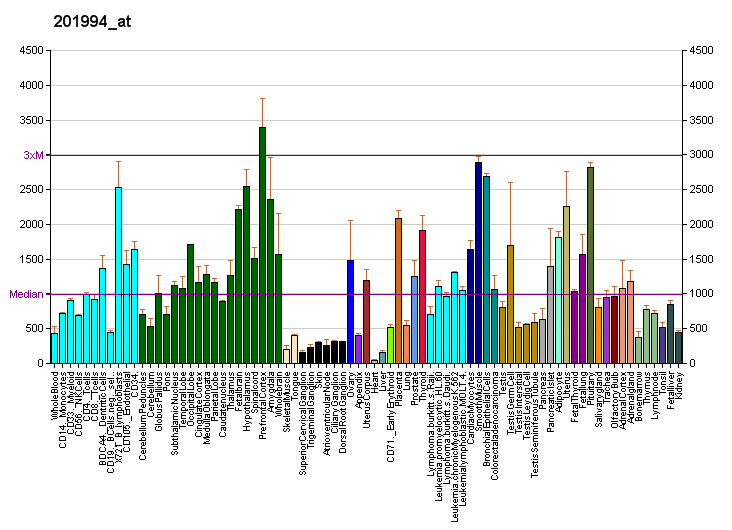
RNA expression pattern
Bgee	Human / Mouse (ortholog); Top expressed in: endothelial cell; Epithelium of choroid plexus; caput epididymis; bronchial epithelial cell; pons; tail of epididymis; postcentral gyrus; Brodmann area 23; seminal vesicula; corpus epididymis / Top expressed in: yolk sac; placenta; mesencephalon; neural tube; lens; epiblast; islet of Langerhans; uterus; ventricular zone; dentate gyrus of hippocampal formation granule cell; More reference expression data
BioGPS	More reference expression data
Gene ontology
Molecular function	protein binding
Cellular component	plasma membrane; nucleolus; nucleus; nucleoplasm; NuA4 histone acetyltransferase complex; histone acetyltransferase complex
Biological process	histone H2A acetylation; chromatin remodeling; regulation of growth; regulation of transcription, DNA-templated; histone deacetylation; DNA repair; transcription, DNA-templated; positive regulation of transcription by RNA polymerase II; positive regulation of striated muscle cell differentiation; cellular response to DNA damage stimulus; histone H4 acetylation; chromatin organization; histone acetylation
Sources:Amigo / QuickGO
Orthologs
Databases	NCBI: entry; OMA: entry
Species	Human	Mouse
Entrez	9643	56397
Ensembl	ENSG00000123562	ENSMUSG00000031422
UniProt	Q15014	Q9R0Q4
RefSeq (mRNA)	NM_012286; NM_001142418; NM_001142419; NM_001142420; NM_001142421 NM_001142422; NM_001142423; NM_001142424; NM_001142425; NM_001142426; NM_001142427; NM_001142428; NM_001142429; NM_001142430; NM_001142431; NM_001142432	NM_001168225; NM_001168226; NM_001168227; NM_001168228; NM_001168229 NM_001168230; NM_019768
RefSeq (protein)	NP_001135890; NP_001135891; NP_001135892; NP_001135893; NP_001135894 NP_001135895; NP_001135896; NP_001135897; NP_001135898; NP_001135899; NP_001135900; NP_001135901; NP_001135902; NP_001135903; NP_001135904; NP_036418	NP_001161697; NP_001161698; NP_001161699; NP_001161700; NP_001161701 NP_001161702; NP_062742
Location (UCSC)	Chr X: 103.68 – 103.69 Mb	Chr X: 135.63 – 135.64 Mb
PubMed search
- Wikidata
View/Edit Human	View/Edit Mouse

Mortality factor 4-like protein 2 is a protein that in humans is encoded by the MORF4L2 gene.
