= GRIPAP1 =

Protein-coding gene in the species Homo sapiens

Identifiers
- Aliases: GRIPAP1, GRASP-1, GRIP1 associated protein 1
- External IDs: OMIM: 300408; MGI: 1859616; HomoloGene: 41348; GeneCards: GRIPAP1; OMA:GRIPAP1 - orthologs

Gene location (Human)
Chr.	X chromosome (human)
Band	Xp11.23	Start	48,973,720 bp
Band	Xp11.23	End	49,002,264 bp

Gene location (Mouse)
Chr.	X chromosome (mouse)
Band	X A1.1|X 3.51 cM	Start	7,656,004 bp
Band	X A1.1|X 3.51 cM	End	7,686,806 bp
RNA expression pattern
Bgee	Human / Mouse (ortholog); Top expressed in: right hemisphere of cerebellum; right frontal lobe; sural nerve; anterior pituitary; cingulate gyrus; anterior cingulate cortex; Brodmann area 9; prefrontal cortex; granulocyte; hypothalamus / Top expressed in: granulocyte; neural layer of retina; superior frontal gyrus; primary visual cortex; dentate gyrus of hippocampal formation granule cell; cerebellar cortex; yolk sac; nucleus of stria terminalis; ventricular zone; central gray substance of midbrain; More reference expression data
BioGPS	n/a
Gene ontology
Molecular function	protein binding; molecular function
Cellular component	endosome; blood microparticle; nucleoplasm; cytosol; intracellular membrane-bounded organelle; postsynaptic recycling endosome; membrane; cell junction; axon; dendrite; early endosome membrane; cell projection; synapse; recycling endosome membrane; glutamatergic synapse; extrinsic component of postsynaptic early endosome membrane
Biological process	neurotransmitter receptor transport, endosome to postsynaptic membrane; regulation of modification of synaptic structure; transport; protein transport; biological process; regulation of neurotransmitter receptor transport, endosome to postsynaptic membrane; regulation of recycling endosome localization within postsynapse
Sources:Amigo / QuickGO
Orthologs
Species	Human	Mouse
Entrez	56850	54645
Ensembl	ENSG00000068400	ENSMUSG00000031153
UniProt	Q4V328	Q8VD04
RefSeq (mRNA)	NM_020137; NM_207672	NM_001290455; NM_207670; NM_001359289; NM_001359290; NM_001359291 NM_001359293
RefSeq (protein)	NP_064522	NP_001277384; NP_997553; NP_001346218; NP_001346219; NP_001346220 NP_001346222
Location (UCSC)	Chr X: 48.97 – 49 Mb	Chr X: 7.66 – 7.69 Mb
PubMed search
- Wikidata
View/Edit Human	View/Edit Mouse

GRIP1-associated protein 1 is a protein that in humans is encoded by the GRIPAP1 gene.

== Function ==
GRASP1 is a neuron-specific guanine nucleotide exchange factor for the Ras family of small G proteins (RasGEF) and is associated with the GRIP/AMPA receptor complex in brain (Ye et al., 2000).[supplied by OMIM]

== Interactions ==
GRIPAP1 has been shown to interact with GRIP1.
