= Zinc finger protein 674 =

Protein in humans

ZNF674

Identifiers
- Aliases: ZNF674, MRX92, ZNF673B, zinc finger protein 674
- External IDs: OMIM: 300573; GeneCards: ZNF674

Gene location (Human)
Chr.	X chromosome (human)
Band	Xp11.3	Start	46,497,725 bp
Band	Xp11.3	End	46,545,457 bp
RNA expression pattern
Bgee	Human / Mouse (ortholog); Top expressed in: gonad; testicle; Achilles tendon; ganglionic eminence; epithelium of colon; ventricular zone; stromal cell of endometrium; muscle of thigh; islet of Langerhans; monocyte / n/a; More reference expression data
BioGPS	n/a
Gene ontology
Molecular function	DNA binding; metal ion binding; nucleic acid binding; DNA-binding transcription factor activity, RNA polymerase II-specific
Cellular component	intracellular anatomical structure; nucleus
Biological process	regulation of transcription, DNA-templated; transcription, DNA-templated; regulation of transcription by RNA polymerase II; negative regulation of transcription, DNA-templated
Sources:Amigo / QuickGO
Orthologs
Databases	NCBI: entry; OMA: entry
Species	Human	Mouse
Entrez	641339	n/a
Ensembl	ENSG00000251192	n/a
UniProt	Q2M3X9	n/a
RefSeq (mRNA)	NM_001039891; NM_001146291; NM_001190417	n/a
RefSeq (protein)	NP_001034980; NP_001139763; NP_001177346	n/a
Location (UCSC)	Chr X: 46.5 – 46.55 Mb	n/a
PubMed search		n/a
- Wikidata
View/Edit Human

Zinc finger protein 674 is a protein that in humans is encoded by the ZNF674 gene.

== Function ==
This gene encodes a zinc finger protein with an N-terminal Kruppel-associated box-containing (KRAB) domain and 11 Kruppel-type C2H2 zinc finger domains. Like other zinc finger proteins, this gene may function as a transcription factor. This gene resides on an area of chromosome X that has been implicated in nonsyndromic X-linked intellectual disability. Alternative splicing results in multiple transcript variants encoding different isoforms.
