= RTL8C =

Protein-coding gene in the species Homo sapiens

Identifiers
- Aliases: RTL8C, CXX1, MAR8C, MART8C, Mar8, Mart8, FAM127A, family with sequence similarity 127 member A, SIRH5, retrotransposon Gag like 8C
- External IDs: OMIM: 300213; MGI: 1920115; GeneCards: RTL8C

Gene location (Human)
Chr.	X chromosome (human)
Band	Xq26.3	Start	135,032,355 bp
Band	Xq26.3	End	135,033,546 bp

Gene location (Mouse)
Chr.	X chromosome (mouse)
Band	X|X A5	Start	52,609,999 bp
Band	X|X A5	End	52,610,399 bp
RNA expression pattern
Bgee	Human / Mouse (ortholog); Top expressed in: Brodmann area 10; frontal pole; right frontal lobe; hypothalamus; cingulate gyrus; anterior cingulate cortex; apex of heart; amygdala; nucleus accumbens; left ventricle / Top expressed in: hypothalamus; striatum of neuraxis; adrenal gland; Cortex of frontal lobe; cerebellar cortex; olfactory bulb; superior frontal gyrus; hippocampus proper; primary visual cortex; lens; More reference expression data
BioGPS	n/a
Gene ontology
Molecular function	protein binding
Cellular component	membrane; plasma membrane; cellular component
Biological process	biological process
Sources:Amigo / QuickGO
Orthologs
Databases	NCBI: entry; OMA: entry
Species	Human	Mouse
Entrez	8933	72865
Ensembl	ENSG00000134590	ENSMUSG00000051851
UniProt	O15255	Q9D6I0
RefSeq (mRNA)	NM_003928; NM_001078171	NM_028375
RefSeq (protein)	NP_001071639	NP_082651
Location (UCSC)	Chr X: 135.03 – 135.03 Mb	Chr X: 52.61 – 52.61 Mb
PubMed search
- Wikidata
View/Edit Human	View/Edit Mouse

Retrotransposon Gag-like protein 8C is a protein that in humans is encoded by the RTL8C gene (previously FAM127A). An alternative transcription of RTL8C can also produce a longer protein, called CAAX box protein 1. RTL8C is part of a family of at least 11 genes that derive from LTR retrotransposons, but no longer function as retrotransposons.
