= EOLA1 =

Protein-coding gene in humans

Identifiers
- Aliases: EOLA1, CXorf40, FLJ16423, chromosome X open reading frame 40A, CXorf40A, endothelium and lymphocyte associated ASCH domain 1
- External IDs: OMIM: 300954; MGI: 1915868; GeneCards: EOLA1

Gene location (Human)
Chr.	X chromosome (human)
Band	Xq28	Start	149,540,355 bp
Band	Xq28	End	149,550,510 bp

Gene location (Mouse)
Chr.	X chromosome (mouse)
Band	X|X A7.2	Start	69,429,483 bp
Band	X|X A7.2	End	69,433,023 bp
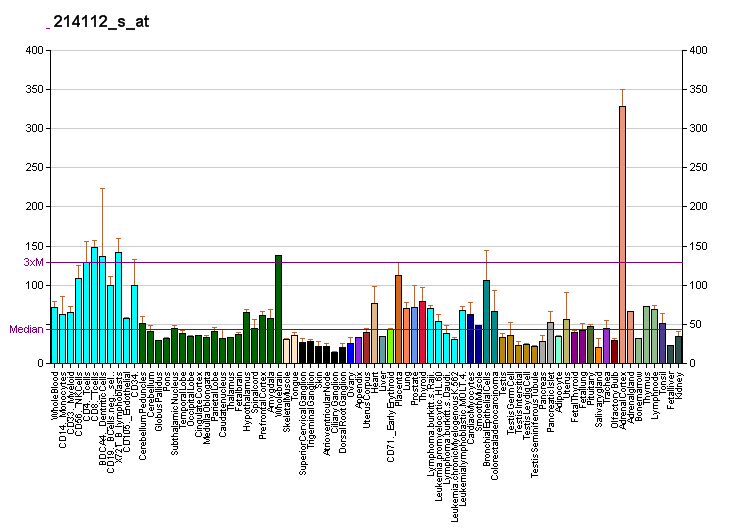

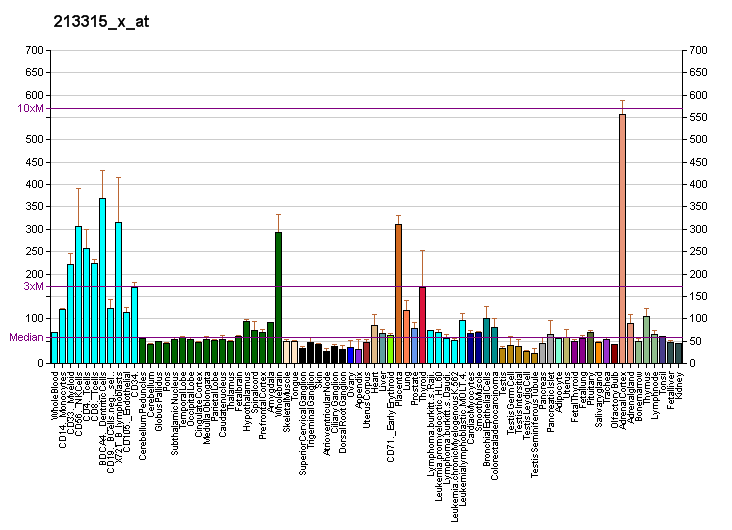

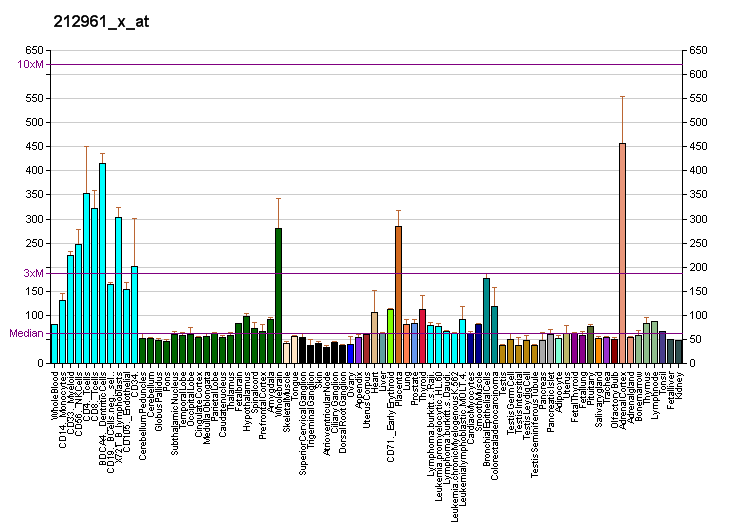
RNA expression pattern
Bgee	Human / Mouse (ortholog); Top expressed in: apex of heart; mucosa of transverse colon; anterior pituitary; left ventricle; granulocyte; left adrenal cortex; prefrontal cortex; muscle of thigh; human kidney; right auricle of heart / Top expressed in: primary oocyte; quadriceps femoris muscle; zygote; skeletal muscle tissue; muscle of thigh; granulocyte; secondary oocyte; urinary bladder; right kidney; proximal tubule; More reference expression data
BioGPS	More reference expression data
Orthologs
Databases	NCBI: entry; OMA: entry
Species	Human	Mouse
Entrez	91966	68618
Ensembl	ENSG00000197620	ENSMUSG00000045237
UniProt	Q8TE69	Q9D1F3
RefSeq (mRNA)	NM_001171907; NM_001171908; NM_001171909; NM_178124; NM_001324274 NM_001324275; NM_001324276; NM_001324277; NM_001324278; NM_001324279; NM_001324280	NM_026787
RefSeq (protein)	NP_001165378; NP_001165379; NP_001165380; NP_001311203; NP_001311204 NP_001311205; NP_001311206; NP_001311207; NP_001311208; NP_001311209; NP_835225	NP_081063
Location (UCSC)	Chr X: 149.54 – 149.55 Mb	Chr X: 69.43 – 69.43 Mb
PubMed search
- Wikidata
View/Edit Human	View/Edit Mouse

Protein EOLA1 (or Endothelial-overexpressed lipopolysaccharide-associated factor 1) is a protein that in humans is encoded by the gene EOLA1 (previously CXorf40A). The EOLA1 protein is involved in regulating the production of interleukin 6, an inflammatory cytokine.
