= FAM156A =

Protein-coding gene in the species Homo sapiens

Identifiers
- Aliases: FAM156A, PRO0659, TMEM29, family with sequence similarity 156 member A
- External IDs: GeneCards: FAM156A

Gene location (Human)
Chr.	X chromosome (human)
Band	Xp11.22	Start	52,926,402 bp
Band	Xp11.22	End	52,995,472 bp
RNA expression pattern
Bgee	Human / Mouse (ortholog); Top expressed in: pituitary gland; right hemisphere of cerebellum; anterior pituitary; apex of heart; Descending thoracic aorta; placenta; tibial nerve; right adrenal cortex; renal cortex; ascending aorta / n/a; More reference expression data
BioGPS	n/a
Orthologs
Databases	NCBI: entry; OMA: entry
Species	Human	Mouse
Entrez	29057	n/a
Ensembl	ENSG00000268350	n/a
UniProt	Q8NDB6	n/a
RefSeq (mRNA)	NM_001242489; NM_001242490; NM_001242491; NM_001242492; NM_001242493 NM_001242494; NM_001242495; NM_001242496; NM_001242497; NM_014138; NM_001377060; NM_001377061; NM_001377062; NM_001377063; NM_001387706	n/a
RefSeq (protein)	NP_001093154; NP_001308107; NP_001308108; NP_001308109; NP_001308110 NP_001308111; NP_001308112; NP_001308115; NP_001308116; NP_001308117	n/a
Location (UCSC)	Chr X: 52.93 – 53 Mb	n/a
PubMed search		n/a
- Wikidata
View/Edit Human

Protein FAM156A is a protein that in humans is encoded by the FAM156A gene (previously TMEM29). Not much has been reported yet about the function of the FAM156A protein. The gene FAM156A has a paralog, FAM156B, that encodes an identical protein.
