= GAGE12F =

Protein-coding gene in humans

Identifiers
- Aliases: GAGE12F, G antigen 12F, GAGE7, AL4, CT4.7, GAGE-7B, GAGE-8, GAGE-7, GAGE7B
- External IDs: OMIM: 300730; GeneCards: GAGE12F

Gene location (Human)
Chr.	X chromosome (human)
Band	Xp11.23	Start	49,551,278 bp
Band	Xp11.23	End	49,568,218 bp
RNA expression pattern
Bgee	Human / Mouse (ortholog); Top expressed in: right testis; testicle; left testis; gonad; apex of heart; canal of the cervix; ectocervix; right adrenal gland; fundus; blood / n/a; More reference expression data
BioGPS	n/a
Gene ontology
Molecular function	molecular function; protein binding
Cellular component	cellular component
Biological process	biological process
Sources:Amigo / QuickGO
Orthologs
Databases	NCBI: entry; OMA: entry
Species	Human	Mouse
Entrez	100008586	n/a
Ensembl	ENSG00000236362	n/a
UniProt	O76087; P0CL80; P0CL81; P0CL82	n/a
RefSeq (mRNA)	NM_001098405	n/a
RefSeq (protein)	NP_001468; NP_001120817; NP_066946; NP_001091875; NP_001091879 NP_001341351; NP_001091875.1; NP_001091879.1; NP_001468.1; NP_066946.1; NP_066946; NP_001091875; NP_001091879; NP_001341351; NP_001468; NP_001091875.1; NP_001091879.1; NP_001468.1; NP_066946.1; NP_066946; NP_001091875; NP_001091879; NP_001341351; NP_001468	n/a
Location (UCSC)	Chr X: 49.55 – 49.57 Mb	n/a
PubMed search		n/a
- Wikidata
View/Edit Human

G antigen 12F is a protein that in humans is encoded by the GAGE12F gene.
