= NAP1L3 =

Protein-coding gene in the species Homo sapiens

Identifiers
- Aliases: NAP1L3, MB20, NPL3, nucleosome assembly protein 1 like 3
- External IDs: OMIM: 300117; MGI: 1859565; GeneCards: NAP1L3

Gene location (Human)
Chr.	X chromosome (human)
Band	Xq21.32	Start	93,670,930 bp
Band	Xq21.32	End	93,673,578 bp

Gene location (Mouse)
Chr.	X chromosome (mouse)
Band	X|X E3	Start	121,304,262 bp
Band	X|X E3	End	121,307,098 bp
RNA expression pattern
Bgee	Human / Mouse (ortholog); Top expressed in: Brodmann area 23; lateral nuclear group of thalamus; superior vestibular nucleus; pons; endothelial cell; pars compacta; superior frontal gyrus; parietal lobe; postcentral gyrus; cerebellar vermis / Top expressed in: dorsomedial hypothalamic nucleus; ventral tegmental area; dorsal tegmental nucleus; medial vestibular nucleus; lateral hypothalamus; superior colliculus; habenula; paraventricular nucleus of hypothalamus; central gray substance of midbrain; pontine nuclei; More reference expression data
BioGPS	n/a
Orthologs
Databases	NCBI: entry; OMA: entry
Species	Human	Mouse
Entrez	4675	54561
Ensembl	ENSG00000186310	ENSMUSG00000055733
UniProt	Q99457	Q794H2
RefSeq (mRNA)	NM_004538	NM_138742
RefSeq (protein)	NP_004529	NP_620081
Location (UCSC)	Chr X: 93.67 – 93.67 Mb	Chr X: 121.3 – 121.31 Mb
PubMed search
- Wikidata
View/Edit Human	View/Edit Mouse

Nucleosome assembly protein 1 like 3 is a protein that in humans is encoded by the NAP1L3 gene.

== Function ==
This gene is intronless and encodes a member of the nucleosome assembly protein (NAP) family. This gene is linked closely to a region of genes responsible for several X-linked cognitive disability syndromes. [provided by RefSeq, Dec 2010].
