= PASD1 =

Protein-coding gene in the species Homo sapiens

Identifiers
- Aliases: PASD1, CT63, OXTES1, PAS domain containing 1, PAS domain containing repressor 1, CT64
- External IDs: OMIM: 300993; HomoloGene: 131196; GeneCards: PASD1; OMA:PASD1 - orthologs

Gene location (Human)
Chr.	X chromosome (human)
Band	Xq28	Start	151,563,675 bp
Band	Xq28	End	151,676,739 bp
RNA expression pattern
Bgee	Human / Mouse (ortholog); Top expressed in: testicle; right testis; left testis; gonad; human musculoskeletal system; muscular system; muscle; skeletal muscle; lower limb muscles; muscle of leg / n/a; More reference expression data
BioGPS	n/a
Gene ontology
Molecular function	transcription coactivator binding
Cellular component	Cry-Per complex; nucleus; nuclear speck
Biological process	negative regulation of circadian rhythm; negative regulation of transcription, DNA-templated; rhythmic process
Sources:Amigo / QuickGO
Orthologs
Species	Human	Mouse
Entrez	139135	n/a
Ensembl	ENSG00000166049	n/a
UniProt	Q8IV76	n/a
RefSeq (mRNA)	NM_173493	n/a
RefSeq (protein)	NP_775764	n/a
Location (UCSC)	Chr X: 151.56 – 151.68 Mb	n/a
PubMed search		n/a
- Wikidata
View/Edit Human

PAS domain-containing protein 1 is a protein that in humans is encoded by the PASD1 gene.

PASD1 has been shown to inhibit the transcriptional activity between CLOCK and BMAL1 which appears to be co-opted in cancer cells to attenuate clock function.
