= RPA-related protein RADX =

Protein found in humans

RADX

Identifiers
- Aliases: RADX, chromosome X open reading frame 57, RPA1 related single stranded DNA binding protein, X-linked, CXorf57
- External IDs: MGI: 2147848; GeneCards: RADX

Gene location (Human)
Chr.	X chromosome (human)
Band	Xq22.3	Start	106,611,930 bp
Band	Xq22.3	End	106,679,439 bp

Gene location (Mouse)
Chr.	X chromosome (mouse)
Band	X|X F1	Start	138,381,116 bp
Band	X|X F1	End	138,455,331 bp
RNA expression pattern
Bgee	Human / Mouse (ortholog); Top expressed in: pituitary gland; anterior pituitary; islet of Langerhans; bronchial epithelial cell; hypothalamus; ventricular zone; ganglionic eminence; left ovary; nucleus accumbens; testicle / Top expressed in: tail of embryo; genital tubercle; primary oocyte; embryo; embryo; morula; secondary oocyte; ileum; uterus; proximal tubule; More reference expression data
BioGPS	n/a
Gene ontology
Molecular function	protein binding; RNA binding; single-stranded DNA binding; DNA binding
Cellular component	replication fork; chromosome
Biological process	negative regulation of double-strand break repair via homologous recombination
Sources:Amigo / QuickGO
Orthologs
Databases	NCBI: entry; OMA: entry
Species	Human	Mouse
Entrez	55086	102871
Ensembl	ENSG00000147231	ENSMUSG00000042498
UniProt	Q6NSI4	Q8C779
RefSeq (mRNA)	NM_001184782; NM_018015	NM_175326; NM_001346522; NM_001358686
RefSeq (protein)	NP_001171711; NP_060485	NP_001333451; NP_780535; NP_001345615
Location (UCSC)	Chr X: 106.61 – 106.68 Mb	Chr X: 138.38 – 138.46 Mb
PubMed search
- Wikidata
View/Edit Human	View/Edit Mouse

RPA-related protein RADX is a protein that in humans is encoded by the RADX gene (previously CXorf57).
