= CD99L2 =

Protein-coding gene in humans

Identifiers
- Aliases: CD99L2, CD99B, MIC2L1, CD99 molecule like 2
- External IDs: OMIM: 300846; MGI: 2177151; HomoloGene: 135743; GeneCards: CD99L2; OMA:CD99L2 - orthologs

Gene location (Human)
Chr.	X chromosome (human)
Band	Xq28	Start	150,766,336 bp
Band	Xq28	End	150,898,816 bp

Gene location (Mouse)
Chr.	X chromosome (mouse)
Band	X|X A7.3	Start	70,463,666 bp
Band	X|X A7.3	End	70,536,455 bp
RNA expression pattern
Bgee	Human / Mouse (ortholog); Top expressed in: prefrontal cortex; gastrocnemius muscle; right frontal lobe; lateral nuclear group of thalamus; Brodmann area 9; C1 segment; muscle of thigh; hypothalamus; cingulate gyrus; anterior cingulate cortex / Top expressed in: Rostral migratory stream; facial motor nucleus; muscle of thigh; ciliary body; iris; retinal pigment epithelium; masseter muscle; pontine nuclei; ventromedial nucleus; aortic valve; More reference expression data
BioGPS	n/a
Gene ontology
Molecular function	protein binding
Cellular component	integral component of membrane; cell junction; plasma membrane; membrane; focal adhesion; cell surface; integral component of plasma membrane
Biological process	cell adhesion; diapedesis; positive regulation of neutrophil extravasation; positive regulation of T cell extravasation; homotypic cell-cell adhesion; T cell extravasation
Sources:Amigo / QuickGO
Orthologs
Species	Human	Mouse
Entrez	83692	171486
Ensembl	ENSG00000102181	ENSMUSG00000035776
UniProt	Q8TCZ2	Q8BIF0
RefSeq (mRNA)	NM_001184808; NM_001242614; NM_031462; NM_134445; NM_134446	NM_001199349; NM_138309
RefSeq (protein)	NP_001171737; NP_001229543; NP_113650; NP_604394; NP_604395	NP_001186278; NP_612182
Location (UCSC)	Chr X: 150.77 – 150.9 Mb	Chr X: 70.46 – 70.54 Mb
PubMed search
- Wikidata
View/Edit Human	View/Edit Mouse

CD99 antigen-like protein 2 is a protein that in humans is encoded by the CD99L2 gene.
