= TSPYL2 =

Protein-coding gene in humans

Identifiers
- Aliases: TSPYL2, CDA1, CINAP, CTCL, DENTT, HRIHFB2216, NP79, SE204, TSPX, TSPY-like 2, TSPY like 2
- External IDs: OMIM: 300564; MGI: 106244; GeneCards: TSPYL2

Gene location (Human)
Chr.	X chromosome (human)
Band	Xp11.22	Start	53,082,367 bp
Band	Xp11.22	End	53,088,540 bp

Gene location (Mouse)
Chr.	X chromosome (mouse)
Band	X F3|X 68.46 cM	Start	151,119,848 bp
Band	X F3|X 68.46 cM	End	151,125,421 bp
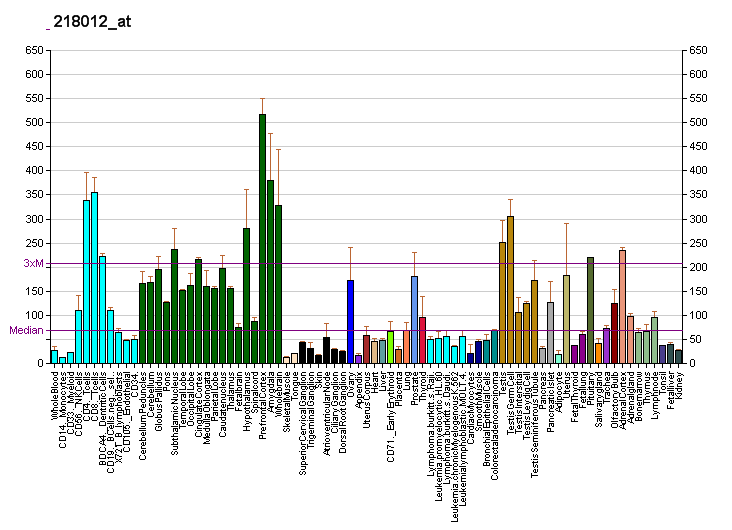
RNA expression pattern
Bgee	Human / Mouse (ortholog); Top expressed in: anterior pituitary; right hemisphere of cerebellum; left ovary; right ovary; right frontal lobe; right testis; left testis; gastric mucosa; tibial nerve; left uterine tube / Top expressed in: neural layer of retina; dorsomedial hypothalamic nucleus; primary visual cortex; superior frontal gyrus; dentate gyrus of hippocampal formation granule cell; paraventricular nucleus of hypothalamus; ventromedial nucleus; genital tubercle; arcuate nucleus; cerebellar cortex; More reference expression data
BioGPS	More reference expression data
Gene ontology
Molecular function	rDNA binding; protein binding
Cellular component	nucleolus; nucleoplasm; nucleus; cytoplasm
Biological process	cell cycle; nucleosome assembly; IRE1-mediated unfolded protein response; negative regulation of cell cycle; negative regulation of DNA replication; regulation of protein kinase activity; regulation of transcription, DNA-templated; regulation of signal transduction; negative regulation of cell growth; transcription, DNA-templated; chromatin organization
Sources:Amigo / QuickGO
Orthologs
Databases	NCBI: entry; OMA: entry
Species	Human	Mouse
Entrez	64061	52808
Ensembl	ENSG00000184205	ENSMUSG00000041096
UniProt	Q9H2G4	Q7TQI8
RefSeq (mRNA)	NM_022117	NM_029836; NM_145936; NM_001358369
RefSeq (protein)	NP_071400	NP_084112; NP_001345298
Location (UCSC)	Chr X: 53.08 – 53.09 Mb	Chr X: 151.12 – 151.13 Mb
PubMed search
- Wikidata
View/Edit Human	View/Edit Mouse

Testis-specific Y-encoded-like protein 2 is a protein that in humans is encoded by the TSPYL2 gene.
