= SPANXN5 =

Protein-coding gene in the species Homo sapiens

Identifiers
- Aliases: SPANXN5, CT11.10, SPANX-N5, SPANX family member N5
- External IDs: OMIM: 300668; GeneCards: SPANXN5

Gene location (Human)
Chr.	X chromosome (human)
Band	Xp11.22	Start	52,796,144 bp
Band	Xp11.22	End	52,797,427 bp
RNA expression pattern
Bgee	Human / Mouse (ortholog); Top expressed in: testicle; right testis; left testis; placenta; duodenum; human musculoskeletal system; skeletal muscle; muscle of leg; pancreas; gastrocnemius muscle / n/a; More reference expression data
BioGPS	n/a
Orthologs
Databases	NCBI: entry; OMA: entry
Species	Human	Mouse
Entrez	494197	n/a
Ensembl	ENSG00000204363	n/a
UniProt	Q5MJ07	n/a
RefSeq (mRNA)	NM_001009616	n/a
RefSeq (protein)	NP_001009616	n/a
Location (UCSC)	Chr X: 52.8 – 52.8 Mb	n/a
PubMed search		n/a
- Wikidata
View/Edit Human

SPANX family member N5 is a protein that in humans is encoded by the SPANXN5 gene.
