= CT55 =

Protein-coding gene in humans

Identifiers
- Aliases: CT55, BJHCC20A, CXorf48, cancer/testis antigen 55
- External IDs: HomoloGene: 49512; GeneCards: CT55; OMA:CT55 - orthologs

Gene location (Human)
| Chr. | X chromosome (human) |
| Band | Xq26.3 | Start | 135,156,540 bp |
| Band | Xq26.3 | End | 135,171,398 bp |
RNA expression pattern
| Bgee | Human / Mouse (ortholog); Top expressed in: gonad; testicle; right testis; left testis; superior frontal gyrus; primary visual cortex; ventricular zone; Brodmann area 9; prefrontal cortex; anterior cingulate cortex / n/a; More reference expression data |
| BioGPS | n/a |
Orthologs
| Species | Human | Mouse |
| Entrez | 54967 | n/a |
| Ensembl | ENSG00000169551 | n/a |
| UniProt | Q8WUE5 | n/a |
| RefSeq (mRNA) | NM_001031705; NM_017863 | n/a |
| RefSeq (protein) | NP_001026875; NP_060333 | n/a |
| Location (UCSC) | Chr X: 135.16 – 135.17 Mb | n/a |
| PubMed search | | n/a |
- Wikidata
| View/Edit Human |

Cancer/testis antigen 55 is a protein that in humans is encoded by the CT55 gene.
