= G protein nucleolar 3 like =

Protein-coding gene in the species Homo sapiens

GNL3L

Identifiers
- Aliases: GNL3L, GNL3B, G protein nucleolar 3 like
- External IDs: OMIM: 300873; MGI: 2448557; HomoloGene: 134538; GeneCards: GNL3L; OMA:GNL3L - orthologs

Gene location (Human)
Chr.	X chromosome (human)
Band	Xp11.22	Start	54,530,183 bp
Band	Xp11.22	End	54,621,521 bp

Gene location (Mouse)
Chr.	X chromosome (mouse)
Band	X|X F3	Start	149,766,137 bp
Band	X|X F3	End	149,800,318 bp
RNA expression pattern
Bgee	Human / Mouse (ortholog); Top expressed in: nipple; sural nerve; pylorus; urethra; epithelium of colon; bone marrow cell; human penis; renal medulla; superior surface of tongue; monocyte / Top expressed in: genital tubercle; dorsomedial hypothalamic nucleus; tail of embryo; paraventricular nucleus of hypothalamus; ventral tegmental area; habenula; suprachiasmatic nucleus; arcuate nucleus; dentate gyrus of hippocampal formation granule cell; piriform cortex; More reference expression data
BioGPS	n/a
Gene ontology
Molecular function	protein binding; nucleotide binding; GTP binding; RNA binding; GTPase activity
Cellular component	nucleus; telomerase holoenzyme complex; membrane; nucleolus; cytosol
Biological process	regulation of protein stability; negative regulation of telomere maintenance via telomerase; positive regulation of protein homodimerization activity; negative regulation of protein sumoylation; positive regulation of protein localization to chromosome, telomeric region; negative regulation of protein ubiquitination; negative regulation of protein binding; ribosome biogenesis
Sources:Amigo / QuickGO
Orthologs
Species	Human	Mouse
Entrez	54552	237107
Ensembl	ENSG00000130119	ENSMUSG00000025266
UniProt	Q9NVN8	Q6PGG6
RefSeq (mRNA)	NM_001184819; NM_019067	NM_001168600; NM_198110
RefSeq (protein)	NP_001171748; NP_061940	NP_001162071; NP_932778
Location (UCSC)	Chr X: 54.53 – 54.62 Mb	Chr X: 149.77 – 149.8 Mb
PubMed search
- Wikidata
View/Edit Human	View/Edit Mouse

G protein nucleolar 3 like is a protein that in humans is encoded by the GNL3L gene.

== Function ==
The protein encoded by this gene appears to be a nucleolar GTPase that is essential for ribosomal pre-rRNA processing and cell proliferation. Two transcript variants encoding the same protein have been found for this gene.
