= TEX11 =

Protein-coding gene in the species Homo sapiens

Identifiers
- Aliases: TEX11, TGC1, TSGA3, SPGFX2, testis expressed 11, ZIP4, MZIP4, Spo22, ZIP4H
- External IDs: OMIM: 300311; MGI: 1933237; HomoloGene: 49962; GeneCards: TEX11; OMA:TEX11 - orthologs

Gene location (Human)
Chr.	X chromosome (human)
Band	Xq13.1	Start	70,528,940 bp
Band	Xq13.1	End	70,908,711 bp

Gene location (Mouse)
Chr.	X chromosome (mouse)
Band	X|X C3	Start	99,882,254 bp
Band	X|X C3	End	100,103,273 bp
RNA expression pattern
Bgee	Human / Mouse (ortholog); Top expressed in: sperm; gonad; body of pancreas; testicle; right testis; left testis; Epithelium of choroid plexus; mucosa of transverse colon; pancreatic epithelial cell; mucosa of sigmoid colon / Top expressed in: spermatid; zygote; secondary oocyte; spermatocyte; embryo; embryo; primary oocyte; seminiferous tubule; Gonadal ridge; iris; More reference expression data
BioGPS	n/a
Gene ontology
Molecular function	protein binding
Cellular component	central element; condensed nuclear chromosome; chromosome; synaptonemal complex
Biological process	fertilization; chiasma assembly; male meiosis chromosome segregation; synaptonemal complex assembly; resolution of meiotic recombination intermediates; negative regulation of apoptotic process; meiosis; male meiotic nuclear division; male gonad development; meiotic gene conversion; reciprocal meiotic recombination
Sources:Amigo / QuickGO
Orthologs
Species	Human	Mouse
Entrez	56159	83558
Ensembl	ENSG00000120498	ENSMUSG00000009670
UniProt	Q8IYF3	Q14AT2
RefSeq (mRNA)	NM_001003811; NM_031276	NM_001167997; NM_031384
RefSeq (protein)	NP_001003811; NP_112566	NP_001161469; NP_113561
Location (UCSC)	Chr X: 70.53 – 70.91 Mb	Chr X: 99.88 – 100.1 Mb
PubMed search
- Wikidata
View/Edit Human	View/Edit Mouse

Testis expressed 11 is a protein that in humans is encoded by the TEX11 gene.

== Function ==
This gene is X-linked and is expressed in only male germ cells. Two alternatively spliced transcript variants encoding distinct isoforms have been found for this gene. [provided by RefSeq, Jul 2008].
