= TCEAL1 =

Protein-coding gene in the species Homo sapiens

Identifiers
- Aliases: TCEAL1, SIIR, WEX9, p21, pp21, transcription elongation factor A like 1
- External IDs: OMIM: 300237; MGI: 2385317; HomoloGene: 3510; GeneCards: TCEAL1; OMA:TCEAL1 - orthologs

Gene location (Human)
Chr.	X chromosome (human)
Band	Xq22.2	Start	103,628,704 bp
Band	Xq22.2	End	103,630,953 bp

Gene location (Mouse)
Chr.	X chromosome (mouse)
Band	X|X F1	Start	135,608,731 bp
Band	X|X F1	End	135,612,227 bp
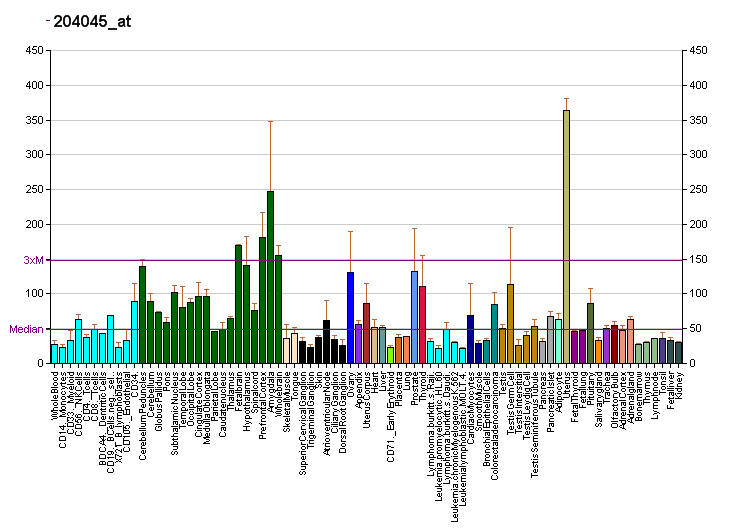
RNA expression pattern
Bgee	Human / Mouse (ortholog); Top expressed in: right ovary; left ovary; left uterine tube; body of uterus; gastric mucosa; right coronary artery; canal of the cervix; thoracic aorta; Descending thoracic aorta; ascending aorta / Top expressed in: dorsomedial hypothalamic nucleus; facial motor nucleus; mammillary body; arcuate nucleus; paraventricular nucleus of hypothalamus; median eminence; ventromedial nucleus; Region I of hippocampus proper; barrel cortex; lateral hypothalamus; More reference expression data
BioGPS	More reference expression data
Gene ontology
Molecular function	DNA-binding transcription factor activity; WW domain binding
Cellular component	nucleus; nucleoplasm
Biological process	regulation of transcription, DNA-templated; negative regulation of transcription by RNA polymerase II; transcription, DNA-templated
Sources:Amigo / QuickGO
Orthologs
Species	Human	Mouse
Entrez	9338	237052
Ensembl	ENSG00000172465	ENSMUSG00000049536
UniProt	Q15170	Q921P9
RefSeq (mRNA)	NM_004780; NM_001006639; NM_001006640	NM_146236; NM_001356367
RefSeq (protein)	NP_001006640; NP_001006641; NP_004771	NP_666348; NP_001343296
Location (UCSC)	Chr X: 103.63 – 103.63 Mb	Chr X: 135.61 – 135.61 Mb
PubMed search
- Wikidata
View/Edit Human	View/Edit Mouse

Transcription elongation factor A protein-like 1 is a protein that in humans is encoded by the TCEAL1 gene.

This gene encodes a member of the transcription elongation factor A (SII)-like (TCEAL) gene family. Members of this family may function as nuclear phosphoproteins that modulate transcription in a promoter context-dependent manner. The encoded protein is similar to transcription elongation factor A/transcription factor SII and contains a zinc finger-like motif as well as a sequence related to the transcription factor SII Pol II-binding region. It may exert its effects via protein-protein interactions with other transcriptional regulators rather than via direct binding of DNA. Multiple family members are located on the X chromosome. Alternative splicing results in multiple transcript variants encoding a single isoform.
