= TTC3P1 =

Pseudogene in the species Homo sapiens

Identifiers
- Aliases: TTC3P1, RNF105L, TTC3L, tetratricopeptide repeat domain 3 pseudogene 1
- External IDs: GeneCards: TTC3P1; OMA:TTC3P1 - orthologs
Orthologs
Species	Human	Mouse
Entrez	286495	n/a
Ensembl	ENSG00000215105	n/a
UniProt	n a	n/a
RefSeq (mRNA)	n/a	n/a
RefSeq (protein)	n/a	n/a
Location (UCSC)	n/a	n/a
PubMed search		n/a
- Wikidata
View/Edit Human

Tetratricopeptide repeat domain 3 pseudogene 1 is a protein that in humans is encoded by the TTC3P1 gene.

== Aliases for TTC3P1 Gene ==
GeneCards Symbol: TTC3P1 2

Tetratricopeptide Repeat Domain 3 Pseudogene 1 2 3 5

RNF105L 2 3 5

TTC3L 3 5

Tetratricopeptide Repeat Domain 3-Like 2

External Ids for TTC3P1 Gene

HGNC: 23318 NCBI Entrez Gene: 286495 Ensembl: ENSG00000215105

Previous HGNC Symbols for TTC3P1 Gene

TTC3L

Previous GeneCards Identifiers for TTC3P1 Gene

GC0XM074961

== Summaries for TTC3P1 Gene ==
GeneCards Summary for TTC3P1 Gene

TTC3P1 (Tetratricopeptide Repeat Domain 3 Pseudogene 1) is a Pseudogene.

Additional gene information for TTC3P1 Gene

HGNC (23318) NCBI Entrez Gene (286495) Ensembl (ENSG00000215105)

Alliance of Genome Resources

Search for TTC3P1 at DataMed

Search for TTC3P1 at HumanCyc
