= SPG16 =

Genetic element in the species Homo sapiens

Identifiers
- Aliases: SPG16, SPG, spastic paraplegia 16 (complicated, X-linked recessive)
- External IDs: GeneCards: SPG16; OMA:SPG16 - orthologs
Orthologs
Species	Human	Mouse
Entrez	57760	n/a
Ensembl	n/a	n/a
UniProt	n a	n/a
RefSeq (mRNA)	n/a	n/a
RefSeq (protein)	n/a	n/a
Location (UCSC)	n/a	n/a
PubMed search		n/a
- Wikidata
View/Edit Human

Spastic paraplegia 16 (complicated, X-linked recessive) is a protein that in humans is encoded by the SPG16 gene.
