= SEDLP =

Pseudogene in the species Homo sapiens

TRAPPC2B

Identifiers
- Aliases: TRAPPC2B, MIP-2A, SEDLP, SEDLP1, TRAPPC2P1, trafficking protein particle complex 2B, trafficking protein particle complex subunit 2B
- External IDs: GeneCards: TRAPPC2B; OMA:TRAPPC2B - orthologs

Gene location (Human)
Chr.	Chromosome 19 (human)
Band	19q13.43	Start	57,363,551 bp
Band	19q13.43	End	57,365,405 bp
RNA expression pattern
Bgee	Human / Mouse (ortholog); Top expressed in: gastrocnemius muscle; muscle of thigh; left adrenal cortex; left testis; testicle; right adrenal gland; right testis; gonad; right adrenal cortex; islet of Langerhans / n/a; More reference expression data
BioGPS	n/a
Orthologs
Species	Human	Mouse
Entrez	10597	n/a
Ensembl	ENSG00000256060	n/a
UniProt	n a	n/a
RefSeq (mRNA)	NM_001355204; NM_015890	n/a
RefSeq (protein)	n/a	n/a
Location (UCSC)	Chr 19: 57.36 – 57.37 Mb	n/a
PubMed search		n/a
- Wikidata
View/Edit Human

Trafficking protein particle complex subunit 2 is a protein that in humans is encoded by the TRAPPC2P1 gene.

This gene has been described as a transcribed retropseudogene (or retro-xaptonuon) based on its structure which lacks most of the introns of SEDL and the detection of transcripts from this locus. Most retropseudogenes are thought to not express protein products. A protein product could potentially be encoded by this retropseudogene that would be identical to the protein product of the SEDL gene. However, it remains unclear whether this gene encodes a protein product or is a transcribed retropseudogene.
