= PAGE1 =

Protein-coding gene in humans

Identifiers
- Aliases: PAGE1, AL5, CT16.3, GAGE-9, GAGEB1, PAGE-1, PAGE family member 1
- External IDs: OMIM: 300288; GeneCards: PAGE1
RNA expression pattern
Bgee	Human / Mouse (ortholog); Top expressed in: testicle; gonad; right testis; buccal mucosa cell; left testis; sural nerve; placenta; endometrium; mammary gland; breast / n/a; More reference expression data
BioGPS	n/a
Orthologs
Databases	NCBI: entry; OMA: entry
Species	Human	Mouse
Entrez	8712	n/a
Ensembl	ENSG00000068985	n/a
UniProt	n a	n/a
RefSeq (mRNA)	NM_003785	n/a
RefSeq (protein)	n/a	n/a
Location (UCSC)	n/a	n/a
PubMed search		n/a
- Wikidata
View/Edit Human

PAGE family member 1 is a protein that in humans is encoded by the PAGE1 gene (prostate associated gene 1).

== Function ==
This gene belongs to a family of genes that are expressed in a variety of tumors but not in normal tissues, except for the testis. Unlike the other gene family members, this gene does not encode an antigenic peptide. Nothing is presently known about the function of this protein.
