= AD16 =

Genetic element in humans

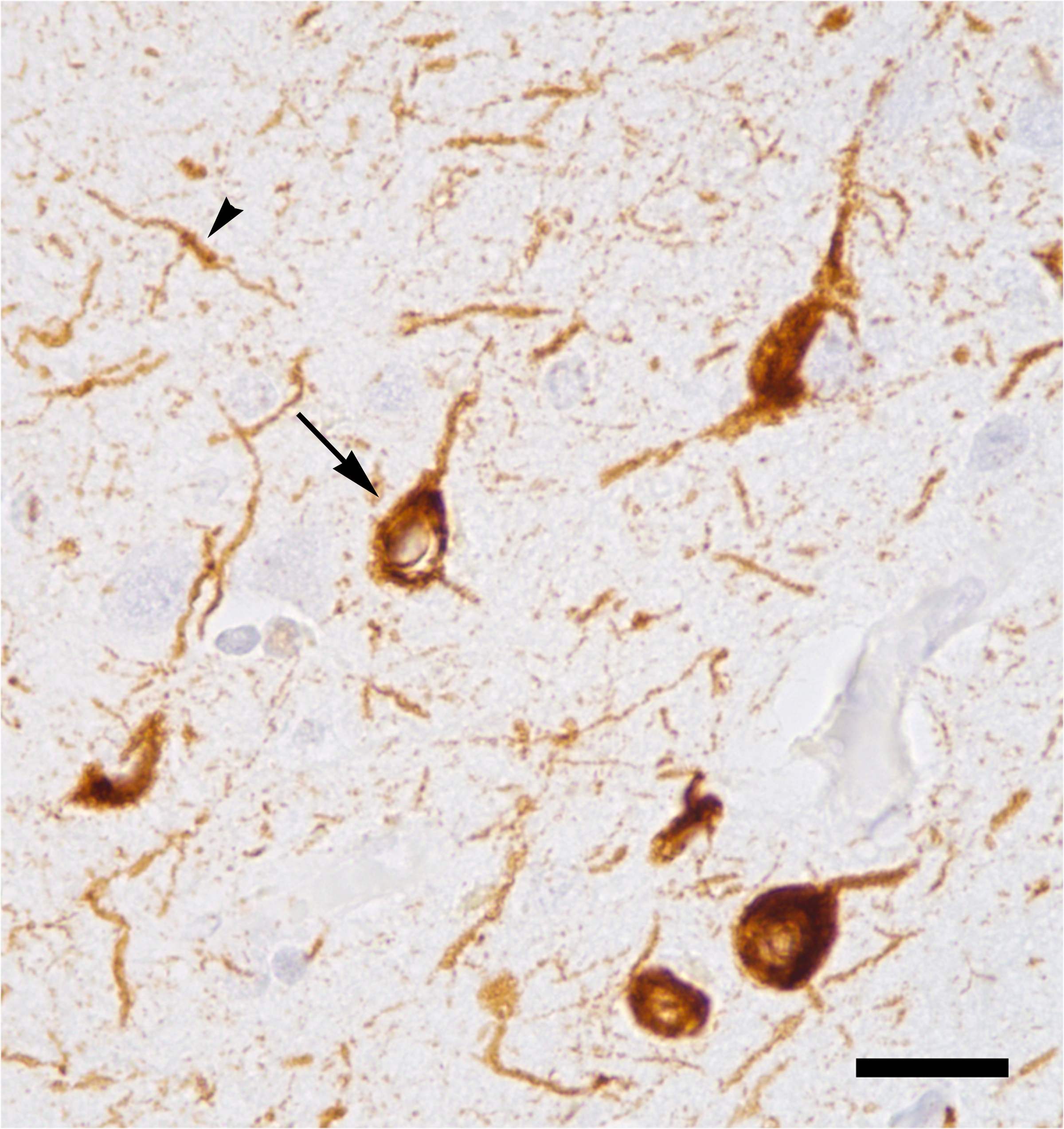

Identifiers
- Aliases: Alzheimer disease 16
- External IDs: GeneCards: ; OMA:- orthologs
Orthologs
Species	Human	Mouse
Entrez	100271718	n/a
Ensembl	n/a	n/a
UniProt	n a	n/a
RefSeq (mRNA)	n/a	n/a
RefSeq (protein)	n/a	n/a
Location (UCSC)	n/a	n/a
PubMed search		n/a
- Wikidata
View/Edit Human

Alzheimer disease 16 is a protein that in humans is encoded by the AD16 gene.
