= Strober =

Strober is a surname. Notable people with the surname include:

- Myra Strober (born c. 1940), American economist
- Rashida Strober (fl. 2011), American playwright and activist
- Samuel Strober (born c. 1940), American physician
