= William A. Haseltine =

American biologist (born 1944)

William Alan Haseltine
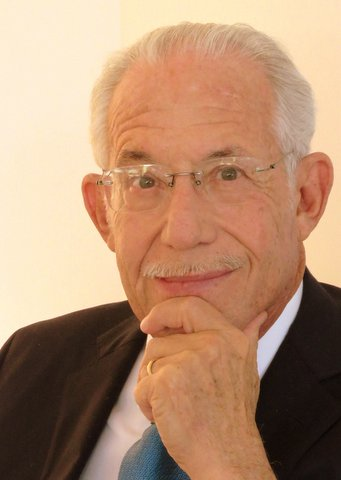
- Born: October 17, 1944 (age 82); St. Louis, Missouri, U.S.
- Education: University of California Berkeley, Harvard University, Massachusetts Institute of Technology

External audio
- “Pandemic Perspectives: Interview with William Haseltine”, Science History Institute, May 28, 2020.

William A. Haseltine (born October 17, 1944) is an American scientist, businessman, author, and philanthropist. He is known for his work on HIV/AIDS and the human genome.

Haseltine was a professor at Harvard Medical School, where he founded two research departments on cancer and HIV/AIDS. He is a founder of several biotechnology companies, including Cambridge Biosciences, The Virus Research Institute, ProScript, LeukoSite, Dendreon, Diversa, X-VAX, and Demetrix. He was a founder chairman and CEO of Human Genome Sciences, a company that pioneered the application of genomics to drug discovery.

== Biography ==
He was born to a scientific family. His grandfather was an engineer, his father a PhD physicist. He was raised at the Naval Ordnance Test Station at China Lake in the Mojave Desert of California, surrounded by weapons scientists and engineers. His older sister Florence received both a Ph.D. in biophysics and an MD, and his younger brother Eric a PhD in neurobiology. His younger sister Susan became a specialist in computer systems.

Haseltine's early life is described in the book Rapture, by Brian Alexander (1d), and in Gene Masters by Ingrid Winkelgren (3d).

Haseltine graduated from Sherman E. Burroughs High School in 1962. In 1966 he received a BA in chemistry from the University of California, Berkeley, and in 1973 a Ph.D. in biophysics from Harvard University.

== Career ==
As a pre-medical undergraduate student majoring in chemistry, he published two scientific papers, one on the composition of the Martian atmosphere in Science and a second on the use of isotope shifted lasers for communication to outer space in Applied Physics Letters. He was elected to Phi Beta Kappa his junior year and graduated at the top of his class. Upon graduation he decided to learn as much about science as possible towards creating new ways to treat and cure disease.

At Harvard University, he worked under the direction of James D. Watson, who shared the Nobel Prize for the discovery of the structure of DNA, and Walter Gilbert, who later received a Nobel Prize for developing a method to determine DNA sequences. He elucidated the means by which bacteria signal the shift from growth when food is abundant to maintenance when food is scarce, the topic of his PhD thesis titled Magic Spot and the Stringent Response.

During his graduate studies, Haseltine was also active in his opposition to the war in Vietnam. He wrote several articles on the use of technology in the Vietnam War and broke the "Agent Orange Defoliation" story in a cover article in the New Republic. He worked with the American Friends Service Committee to create a resource center for those who wished to understand their own communities’ involvement in the war and lectured against the war throughout the country for several years. He was a founder of "Science for the People".

In 1973, Haseltine joined the laboratory of David Baltimore at the Massachusetts Institute of Technology as a post-doctoral fellow. There he began to work on fundamental aspects of how retroviruses known to cause cancer in animals reproduce. His work, in collaboration with several other scientists, provided unexpected insights into the process of retrovirus replication and was recognized as innovative in publication in leading scientific journals. This work prepared him for research on human disease and retroviruses, both important later in his career.

He interrupted his postdoctoral studies at MIT briefly the summer of 1973 to serve as a visiting professor at the University of Copenhagen Faculty of Health and Medical Sciences, where he continued his work on the regulation of gene expression in bacteria.

== Research ==
=== Cancer research ===
In 1976, he joined the faculty of the new comprehensive cancer center, the Dana Farber Cancer Institute affiliated with Harvard Medical School. He became a professor in the Harvard Medical School Department of Pathology and shortly thereafter a professor in the Cancer Biology Department of the Harvard School of Public Health. He founded the equivalent of two academic departments: the Laboratory of Biochemical Pharmacology devoted to work on cancer cause and treatment, and the Division of Human Retrovirology, dedicated, understanding and finding treatments for HIV/AIDS. As a professor, he published more than two hundred research articles in leading scientific journals and edited several books. He mentored dozens of graduate students and postdoctoral fellows, many of whom have gone on to successful careers of their own at Harvard and elsewhere. He taught advanced level courses in cancer biology and HIV/AIDS to graduate and medical students. For many years he taught a course "Biology and Social Issues" for Harvard non-science undergraduates and was a tutor and thesis advisor for several generations of Harvard undergraduate biochemistry students.

Retrovirus replication continued to be a focus of his early research as a Harvard professor. This research led to fundamental insights including the "end to end jumping" of the initial copy of the genome. He then began to focus on two related issues: how retroviruses induce cancer in animals, and whether or not retroviruses cause cancer and other diseases in humans. His laboratory discovered that the key determinant of the ability of retroviruses, those that do not carry oncogenes, to cause cancer is their ability to rapidly replicate in cells that themselves grow rapidly. This allows the retrovirus to implant nearby a cellular oncogene. Another impact for science was his work on the small genetic elements upstream of the transcription start site, now called enhancers, which determine the rate at which genes are copied into RNA. This work provided a key insight into factors that distinguish one cell type from another. Haseltine's account of having identified transcriptional enhancers has been disputed. In The Exceptions (2023), Kate Zernike writes that the discovery was first published by Nancy Hopkins' laboratory in PNAS in July 1983, and situates the episode within a broader account of the treatment of women scientists at MIT. Zernike gathered statements from individuals from the time that argued Haseltine's professor, David Baltimore, had repeatedly acted against Hopkins' advancement in the field due to his resentment of her success as a woman in science.

In 1978, Haseltine began to focus on improving chemotherapy by exploring how the drugs and radiation used to treat cancer worked, as many anti-cancer treatments killed the rapidly growing cancer cells by damaging DNA. The Haseltine lab was among the first to apply the new techniques of DNA sequencing to this understanding of DNA damage and its repair.

The laboratory extended this work to study the process by which cancer causing chemicals and radiation cause the changes to DNA which can lead to cancer. The work revealed a new and unexpected form of sun-induced DNA damage, called the 6-4 lesion, is responsible for most mutations in sun exposed skin that cause cancers including melanoma.

=== Human T Cell Leukemia Virus ===
Haseltine was one of the very few scientists in the late 1970s who continued to work on the concept that retroviruses played an important role in human diseases. This idea once popular in the late 1960s and early 1970s was abandoned by many after a decade or more of a futile search for human retroviruses by laboratories around the world. Haseltine, working with a few other scientists, thought that human retroviruses would behave differently from those that affect laboratory animals such as mice and would behave more like those that cause cancer and immunological deficiencies in non-laboratory animals. These viruses seem to disappear after early infection, the disease appearing only after several years. Haseltine devoted part of his laboratory to the study of retroviruses in these animals in the hope that they would provide insight into human disease. In 1978 he helped to design a special containment laboratory at the Dana Farber Cancer Institute to work on these viruses should they be discovered, a step later essential for his work on HIV/AIDS.

In 1979 the first human retrovirus to cause a human disease was discovered, the Human T cell leukemia Virus (HTLV). HTLV is sexually transmitted from men to women, by women to their children and by blood transfusions. The disease, T-cell leukemia, arises decades after infection. Haseltine and his laboratory discovered that HTLV carried a novel gene called the transactivator X (now called tax). Over the next few years, Haseltine and his colleagues showed that tax is the gene responsible for the cancers. Haseltine spent the summer of 1983 as a visiting professor at the University of Kyoto working with Japanese scientists studying the Human T cell Leukemia virus, a virus endemic to Japan.

=== HIV/AIDS research and public policy ===
The work HTLV prepared Haseltine for work on AIDS. Before the AIDS epidemic was identified, Haseltine already had the expertise and the facilities to study human retroviruses. He first learned of the new disease from colleagues in late 1981. In early 1982 he and a few other scientists who were working on HTLV formed a small working group to identify the cause of the new disease. They met regularly every 4–6 weeks from early 1982 to 1985. With help from the Centers of Disease Control, this group formed the hypothesis that AIDS was caused by a human retrovirus similar to HTLV. They proposed to use methods similar to those used to isolate the HTLV virus to find this new virus. These methods were successfully used to isolate the virus, now called the Human Immunodeficiency Virus (HIV) and to demonstrate that it is the cause of AIDS.

He predicted that drugs that target these proteins will also be effective in treating the infection. A drug that inhibits the rev protein has been approved by the USA Food and Drug administration for treatment of HIV infection.His laboratory went on to describe additional viral genes and proteins – vpr, vpu, vif, and nef required for efficient virus growth in some but not all circumstances.

The discoveries were summarized in an article in 1988 in Scientific American.

Haseltine was appointed to the council of the National Institute of Allergy and Infectious Disease (NIAID) to help direct how these funds were to be used. Over the next few years funding of HIV/AIDS research grew to about $2 billion per year. Haseltine played an important early role in the creation of the International Society for AIDS Research, now the International AIDS Society, and was the Founding editor of the scientific journal AIDS Research and Human Retroviruses..

Haseltine then helped design programs to transfer knowledge from academic laboratories to pharmaceutical and biotechnology companies to develop new anti viral drugs. Early on pharmaceutical companies were reluctant to initiate new research programs on HIV/AIDS. Biotechnology companies lacked the necessary funds and expertise for such work. To address this issue, Haseltine suggested that NIAID create a special grant program to encourage pharmaceutical and biotech companies to work on HIV related problems. Under this program a relatively large amount of money was granted to academic scientists provided that their laboratory have a pharmaceutical or biotechnology partner capable of translating knew knowledge to new drugs. The majority of the funds of these grants went to the industry partner to encourage the development of new drug research activities. These co-operative drug development grants led directly to the discovery of the protease inhibitors that changed the course of HIV/AIDS treatment and later to drugs that effectively target the integrase and envelope proteins.

By 1992, only ten years after the AIDS virus was first recognized, the institutions that today guide HIV/AIDS research were created and still endure.

In the early days of the epidemic Haseltine recognized a two-fold problem in public perception. Many, both within and outside of the scientific/medical community, did not believe the epidemic would ever pose a serious threat to populations. Others believed that AIDS patients posed an immediate threat of infection and must avoided. To address this issue Haseltine help to create and guide several different groups. One of the most successful of these was the American Foundation of AIDS Research. Haseltine became the first chairman and board member of the scientific advisory board of AMFAR.

The mission was twofold: to make start up grants available for those wishing to begin work on HIV/AIDS and to de-stigmatize HIV/AIDS. Many of today's leaders of HIV/AIDS received their first support from AMFAR. The second goal was to provide a body of scientific and medical experts willing to speak out about the danger and magnitude of the epidemic and to provide a credible reference for those worried about causal transmission- in others words, a group of qualified experts to speak about the real dangers of the disease and to counter unjustified fears. AMFAR continues in this role today.

=== Biotechnology ===
William Haseltine has also had an active career in biotechnology. He is the founder of several companies, an advisor to venture capital groups, and was the founder, chairman, and CEO of a major biotechnology company, Human Genome Sciences. Haseltine's interest in biotechnology and pharmaceutical companies arose from his desire to convert new knowledge into new ways to treat and cure disease.

In 1981 he founded Cambridge BioSciences to create a new generation of animal vaccines. The first product, developed for the French company Virbac, was a vaccine to protect domestic cats from infection by the feline leukemia virus. The company developed an effective vaccine, one that used recombinant viral protein and a novel adjuvant, Stimulon, to make the vaccine more potent. It was the first vaccine to protect mammals from a retrovirus infection. Cambridge BioScience also participated in the creation of the first anti-HIV protease drug, Nelfinavir.

In 1987 Haseltine became an advisor to a venture capital company, Healthcare Ventures. Over the next several years together, they founded several biotechnology companies, each working in a different area of science and medicine.

In the late 1980s, Haseltine was asked by several Harvard colleagues to help create their own companies. Among these was ProScript Inc. ProScript discovered the drug Velcade, an inhibitor of the proteosome, that has proved to be an effective treatment for multiple myeloma and other cancers. Haseltine and a colleague also founded LeukoSite Inc. to develop drugs to treat autoimmune diseases. LeukoSite, also initially funded by Healthcare Ventures, acquired ProScript which in turn was acquired by Millennium Pharmaceuticals, the company that successfully brought Velcade to market. Millennium was acquired in 2008 by Takeda Pharmaceutical Company. Today Velcade is an important drug in the treatment of multiple myeloma.

Knowledge of the importance of dendritic cells in HIV infection provided the insight that led to the formation of a company that pioneered immune cell therapy of cancer. Together with Healthcare Ventures, Haseltine formed the company Activated Cell Therapy Inc. to use dendritic cells to treat cancer. The company was eventually renamed Dendreon Corp. and successfully brought to market the first approved cell-based immune therapy, Provenge, for the treatment of metastatic prostate cancer. Haseltine also was the founder of a company called Diversa. It was originally named Industrial Genome Sciences Inc. The company uses genomics to identify enzymes for industrial and commercial applications. Diversa changed its name to Verenium Corporation in 2007 and was purchased by BASF Corporation on October 31, 2013. Haseltine and colleagues founded two new biotechnology companies in 2016, X-VAX, and Demetrix.

=== Human Genome Sciences ===
In early 1992, Haseltine co-founded Human Genome Sciences. He served as the founding chairman and chief executive officer for the first twelve years of the company. He used systematic knowledge of the HIV genomics to fundamental biological discoveries and drug development.

Haseltine proposed to create a new, large pharmaceutical company that not only would pioneer the development of a powerful new set of tools for drug discovery but also apply these tools to the discovery, development manufacture and sale of its own drugs. To support this vision, which he estimated would take twenty years to effect, he suggested that the company raise money by sharing the rights to the gene discovery tools with other pharmaceutical companies. This idea became the founding vision of the company.

In April 1993, SmithKline Beecham invested in Human Genome Sciences to acquire access to the new tools of genomic discovery. The initial $125 million transaction was at the time the largest funding received by a fledgling biotechnology company. A year later Human Genome Sciences and SmithKline Beecham split another $320 million raised by selling access to the Human Genome Sciences discovery tools to several other pharmaceutical companies, including the Japanese company Takeda, the German company Merck, the US company Schering Plough and the French Company Sanofi.

At the time, the idea that newly isolated human genes of unknown function could prove useful for drug development was widely criticized. Haseltine's experience with HIV taught him that knowledge of the genome without prior knowledge of function was useful and had led to the discovery of new and useful drug targets and new and effective drugs. Haseltine argued that if one new human gene were discovered, the techniques of modern biology would allow its natural function and potential medical use identified. If that were true for one gene, then why not all the human genes? New tools had been developed that allowed what had been tedious hard work of gene isolation and characterization to be replaced by highly automated instruments and the data regarding the structure, tissue and cell location and the results of functional tests to be stored and easily accessed using advanced computer technologies. He summarized these views with the statement "Genomics is not necessarily Genetics". It was not until the Human Genome Science approach was validated by its own work and the work of its partners that it was ultimately adopted by the scientific community. Today, the approach pioneered by Human Genome Sciences is one of the principal tools used for the discovery and characterization of novel human genes and as well as the genes of other species.

The gene discovery efforts of Human Genome Sciences were successful. By the fall of 1994 the Institute of Genomic Research working with Human Genome Sciences had isolated and characterized by partial sequence analysis more than 90% of all human genes. Preliminary information regarding the tissue and cell in which they were expressed as messenger RNA was available and data regarding their expression in normal and disease tissues.

The work of drug discovery then began. Over the next several years Human Genome Sciences initiated clinical trials of several new drugs discovered using genomic methods. These included a new skin growth factor, Keratinocyte growth factor 2, for the treatment of diabetic ulcers and cancer therapy induced mucositis, vascular endothelial growth factor for the treatment of peripheral limb ischemia, radio-iodinated B Lymphocyte Stimulator (BLyS) for the treatment of multiple myeloma, a monoclonal antibody to treat cancer that recognizes the Trail receptor, and a monoclonal antibody that antagonizes BLyS (belimumab, trade name Benlysta).

Benlysta was approved for the treatment of lupus by the US FDA in 2010. Haseltine directed research on an antidote to anthrax immediately following the anthrax attacks of 2001.

Human Genome Sciences pioneered long-acting forms of GLP-1 therapies that proved superior to earlier drugs for diabetes management and appetite control. Albiglutide, the first GLP-1 approved for human use in 2014, was among its key developments. In July 2012, Human Genome Sciences was acquired by GlaxoSmithKline for $3.6 billion, giving GSK exclusive rights to Benlysta and Abthrax, as well as to Albiglutide for diabetes and Darapladib for coronary artery disease, both then in late-stage clinical trials.

=== Regenerative medicine ===
Although the term had a prior history, Haseltine is credited with widespread use of the term "regenerative medicine," particularly in the sense that it is used today. After he was briefed on the project to isolate human embryonic stem cells and embryonic germ cells at Geron Corporation in collaboration with researchers at the University of Wisconsin-Madison and Johns Hopkins School of Medicine, Haseltine recognized that these cells' unique ability to differentiate into all the cell types of the human body (pluripotency) opened the door for the first time in history to a new kind of regenerative therapy. At a conference near Lake Como, Italy in 1999, he explained that several new technologies – including gene therapy, stem cell therapy, tissue engineering, and biomechanical prosthetics – collectively opened up a new ability, to which he applied the term "regenerative medicine" in the way that it is used today: "an approach to therapy that ... employs human genes, proteins and cells to re-grow, restore or provide mechanical replacements for tissues that have been injured by trauma, damaged by disease or worn by time" and "offers the prospect of curing diseases that cannot be treated effectively today, including those related to aging."

Haseltine went on to co-found E-Biomed: The Journal of Regenerative medicine and The Society for Regenerative Medicine to help expand this emerging biotechnology. Haseltine authored several articles that laid out the fundamental structure of the new discipline.

=== COVID-19 ===
Haseltine opposed the strategy of waiting for "herd immunity" for COVID. Given that "with around 10% of the country that's become infected, 216,000 people have died, roughly"—as he noted in a television interview on October 14, 2020—achieving a 60%–70% infection rate would mean “two to six million Americans dead—not just this year but every year.” He also warned about the risks that come with a fast-tracked vaccine and pleads for other solutions until a treatment or vaccine can be delivered safely. On January 4, 2021, he advocated a role for a post-presidency Donald Trump as a vaccine advocate, since he had flipped from his earlier anti-vax position and fast-tracked vaccine development with Operation Warp Speed.

He is also the author of multiple books on COVID-19, including A Family Guide to COVID (June 30, 2020), written to help young readers understand the coronavirus, as well as COVID Commentaries: A Chronicle of a Plague (2021), Variants! The Shape-Shifting Challenge of COVID-19 (2022), and the textbook series COVID, Crisis, and Recovery (2021) that examines the science, medicine, and public health responses to the pandemic".

== Government consultant ==
Haseltine has also served as a consultant to several governments. He was a member of the AIDS Executive Committee of the National Institutes of Health from 1986 to 1992 and served on the Council of the National Institute of Allergy and Infectious diseases from 1987 to 1991. It was during this time that he played a central role in crafting the US response to the HIV/AIDS epidemic. He was also an advisor to the President's Emergency Plan For AIDS Relief. From 1986 to 1990 he served as an informal advisor to the French government on HIV/AIDS. He has advised the governments of France, Germany, Italy, Hungary, India, and Singapore on biotechnology and economic development.

== Philanthropy ==
Haseltine began his career in philanthropy in 2004. He created two charitable foundations: The Foundation for Science and the Arts and ACCESS Health International, both 501C3 corporations. The Foundation for Medical Sciences and the Arts supports both biomedical research and the arts including the visual arts, music, opera and dance. A special focus of the foundation is the creation of works of art and music that interpret discoveries of biology and medicine.

Haseltine is a founder, chairman, and president of ACCESS Health International. Since its founding in 2007, ACCESS Health International has established itself as a leading global health systems think tank, operating across multiple continents with offices in the United States, India, Southeast Asia, and the Middle East and North Africa. The organization has engaged with over 25 countries on health systems strengthening initiatives, published more than 125 policy-relevant research papers, and impacted over one million lives through collaborative projects with governments, healthcare providers, and multilateral institutions.

Most notably, ACCESS Health has pioneered knowledge-transfer models through learning collaboratives. In 2010, it co-founded the Joint Learning Network for Universal Health Coverage in partnership with the World Bank, Results for Development, and other partners; the network has grown from an initial cohort to roughly 30 member countries and has supported the development of dozens of practical tools and knowledge products that countries adapt for universal health coverage reforms. In 2021, with support from The Rockefeller Foundation, ACCESS Health launched the Global Learning Collaborative for Health Systems Resilience, for which it serves as secretariat, convening health systems experts from 22 countries to co-create evidence-based tools and strategies for pandemic preparedness and health system resilience.

ACCESS Health’s research and implementation support has also been instrumental in advancing health financing reforms, particularly in South Asia. Since 2018, the organization has provided technical assistance to operationalize India's Ayushman Bharat-Pradhan Mantri Jan Arogya Yojana, one of the largest publicly funded health insurance schemes globally, in collaboration with state and national agencies including the National Health Authority. Beyond health insurance ecosystem development, ACCESS Health's work encompasses digital health infrastructure, strategic purchasing mechanisms, and quality improvement initiatives. The organization's research portfolio addresses critical health systems challenges including pharmaceutical policy, health technology assessment, cardiovascular disease prevention through the Asia Pacific Cardiovascular Disease Alliance, hepatitis elimination via the Stop Hep Alliance, and climate-sensitive health system design through its focus on one-health approaches. ACCESS Health seeks to bridge gaps in the research-to-policy-to-practice continuum, fostering knowledge exchange, and advancing evidence-informed approaches to achieving universal health coverage across the world.

== Awards and honors ==
In 2023, Haseltine received the Institute of Human Virology (IHV) Lifetime Achievement Award for his contributions to biomedical research and global health. In 2024, he was recognized in Marquis Who’s Who for his achievements in science and medicine.

== Writing and Public Commentary ==
Haseltine has been a prolific contributor to scientific literature and popular media. In recent years, he has written extensively for Forbes, covering topics such as genomics, cancer research, biotechnology, artificial intelligence in medicine, and healthcare innovation.

His articles explore the ethical and societal implications of AI in drug discovery, personalized medicine, and emerging biomedical technologies. Beyond articles, Haseltine has authored multiple books, book chapters, and peer-reviewed papers, often emphasizing the importance of translational research, open science, and the integration of technology in medicine.

== Board Memberships and Affiliations ==
Haseltine holds several leadership and advisory roles in scientific, philanthropic, and educational organizations. In 2024, he joined the Board of Trustees of the Phillip and Patricia Frost Museum of Science in Miami, Florida, supporting STEM education, science outreach, and public engagement. He also serves on the boards of Coregen and Senvi, biotechnology companies advancing innovations in genetic medicine and healthy longevity. He has previously served on advisory boards for global health organizations, research foundations, and biotechnology companies.

== Global Health and Philanthropy ==
Through Haseltine Global Health and ACCESS Health International, Haseltine has focused on improving healthcare delivery, health systems, and policy innovation worldwide. His work emphasizes expanding access to medical care in low-resource settings, strengthening public health infrastructure, and implementing innovative approaches to disease prevention and treatment. Recent projects have included collaborations with governments, international agencies, and research institutions to enhance healthcare delivery, develop new treatment strategies, and advance global health equity. Haseltine’s philanthropic efforts also include supporting STEM education and mentoring programs for emerging scientists and healthcare leaders.

== Personal life ==
His first marriage was to Patricia Eileen Gercik. He is currently married to Maria Eugenia Maury.

== Books ==
- Affordable Excellence: the Singapore Healthcare Story; William A Haseltine. Brookings Institution Press, National University of Singapore Press. ISBN 9780815724162. (2013)
- Improving the Health of Mother and Child: Solutions from India; Priya Anant, Prabal Vikram Singh, Sofi Bergkvist, William A. Haseltine & Anita George. ACCESS Health Press. ISBN 9781480072060. (2014)
- Modern Aging: A Practical Guide for Developers, Entrepreneurs, and Startups in the Silver Market; Edited by Sofia Widén, Stephanie Treschow, and William A. Haseltine. Amazon.com, ACCESS Health Press. (2015)
- Aging with Dignity: Innovation and Challenge is Sweden-The Voice of Care Professionals; Sofia Widen and William A. Haseltine, Nordic Academic Press. ISBN 978-91 88168-90-0. (2017)
- Every Second Counts: Saving Two Million Lives. India’s Emergency response System. The EMRI Story; William A Haseltine. Thethys Press India, The Brooking Institution Press. ISBN 978-93-83125-15-9. ISBN 9780815737070 (2017)
- Voices in Dementia Care; Anna Dirksen and William A Haseltine, Thethys Press India. ISBN 978-93-83125-16-6. Greenleaf Book Group. ISBN 9781626346932. (2018)
- Aging Well; William A. Haseltine and Jean Galiana. Palgrave Macmillan (hard copy), Greenleaf Book Group (paperback). ISBN 9781626346956. (2019)
- World Class. Adversity, Transformation and Success and NYU Langone Health William A Haseltine. Fast Company Press. ISBN 9781732439108. (2019)
- A Family Guide to Covid: Questions and Answers for Parents, Grandparents and Children William A Haseltine. ISBN 9798655398283. ISBN 9780578720821.(2020)
- Stay Young Navigators: The Pursuit of Active Aging and Seniors Caring for Seniors William A Haseltine. ACCESS Health Press. ISBN 9781679983467.(2020)
- A Covid Back To School Guide: Questions and Answers for Parents and Students William A Haseltine. ACCESS Health Press. ISBN 9780578743615. (2020)
- Covid Commentaries: A Chronicle of a Plague, Volumes I and II William A Haseltine. ACCESS Health Press. ISBN 979-8-9861334-0-9. (2020)
- My Lifelong Fight Against Disease: From Polio and AIDS to Covid-19 William A Haseltine. Mascot Books. ISBN 9781645438267. (2020)
- Science As A Superpower: My Lifelong Fight Against Disease and the Heroes Who Made It Possible William A Haseltine. ACCESS Health Press. ISBN 9780578930299. (2021)
- Covid Related Post Traumatic Stress Disorder, CV-PTSD: What It Is and What To Do About It. William A Haseltine. ACCESS Health Press. ISBN 9780578960333. (2021)
- Variants! The Shape-shifting Challenge of Covid-19. 4th Edition. William A Haseltine. ACCESS Health Press. ISBN 9780578860855. (2021)
- Natural Immunity and Covid-19: What it is and How it Can Save Your Life. William A Haseltine. ACCESS Health Press. ISBN 978-0578386294. (2022)
- Omicron: From Pandemic to Endemic: The Future of Covid-19 William A Haseltine. ACCESS Health Press. ISBN 9780578281636. (2022)
- A Family Guide to Long Covid: Questions & Answers William A Haseltine. ACCESS Health Press. ISBN 9798986133461. (2022)
- Monoclonal Antibodies: The Once and Future Cure for Covid-19 William A Haseltine and Griffin McCombs. ACCESS Health Press. ISBN 9798986133485. (2023)
- The Future of Medicine: Healing Yourself: Regenerative Medicine Part One William A Haseltine. ACCESS Health Press. ISBN 9798986133454. (2023)
- Viroids and Virusoids: Nature’s Own mRNAs William A Haseltine and Koloman Rath. ACCESS Health Press. ISBN 9798989082308. (2023)
- CAR T: A New Cure for Cancer, Autoimmune and Inherited Disease William A Haseltine and Amara Thomas. ACCESS Health Press. ISBN 9798989082346. (2023)
- Ending Hepatitis C: A Seven-step Plan for a Successful Eradication Program: A Roadmap for Ending Endemic Disease Globally William A Haseltine and Kaelyn Varner. ACCESS Health Press. ISBN 9798989082315. (2023)
- The COVID-19 Textbook: Science, Medicine and Public Health William A Haseltine and Roberto Patarca. Wolters Kluwer. ISBN 9781975202330. (2023)
- Better Eyesight: What You and Modern Medicine Can Do to Improve Your Vision William A. Haseltine and Kim Hazel. ISBN 9798989082360. (2024)
- Fusion! The Melding of Human and Machine Intelligence William A. Haseltine and Griffin McCombs. ISBN 9798989082377. (2024)
- Molecular Biology of SARS-CoV-2: Opportunities for Antivirus Drug Development William A. Haseltine and Roberto Patarca. ISBN 9781975231347. (2024)
- Checkpoint Inhibitors: A Key to Curing Cancer William A. Haseltine & Amara Thomas. ISBN 9798992158304. (2025)
- Live Longer: What You Can Do, What Medicine Can Do William A. Haseltine and Koloman Rath. ISBN 9798992158335.(2025)
- Haseltine, William A. (2025). Destiny's Child No Longer: Rewriting Genetic Fate (published June 1, 2025). ISBN 979-8992158366.
- Hazel, Kim; Haseltine, William (December 31, 2025). The Biology of Desire: Your Brain & Behavior. Amazon Digital Services LLC - Kdp. ISBN 979-8-9921583-8-0.

=== Recent Textbooks ===
- Haseltine, William A. (2025). The COVID-19 Textbook: Science, Medicine and Public Health. Roberto Patarca. Philadelphia: Wolters Kluwer Health. ISBN 978-1-9752-0233-0.
- Patarca-Montero, Roberto; Haseltine, William A. (2025). Molecular biology of SARS-CoV-2: opportunities for antivirus drug development. Philadelphia: Wolters Kluwer. ISBN 978-1-9752-3132-3.
