= Cancer research =

Research into causes and treatment of cancer

Cancer research is research into cancer to identify causes and develop strategies for prevention, diagnosis, treatment, and cure.

Cancer research ranges from epidemiology, molecular bioscience to the performance of clinical trials to evaluate and compare applications of the various cancer treatments. These applications include surgery, radiation therapy, chemotherapy, hormone therapy, immunotherapy and combined treatment modalities such as chemo-radiotherapy. Starting in the mid-1990s, the emphasis in clinical cancer research shifted towards therapies derived from biotechnology research, such as cancer immunotherapy and gene therapy.

Cancer research is done in academia, research institutes, and corporate environments, and is largely government funded.

== History ==
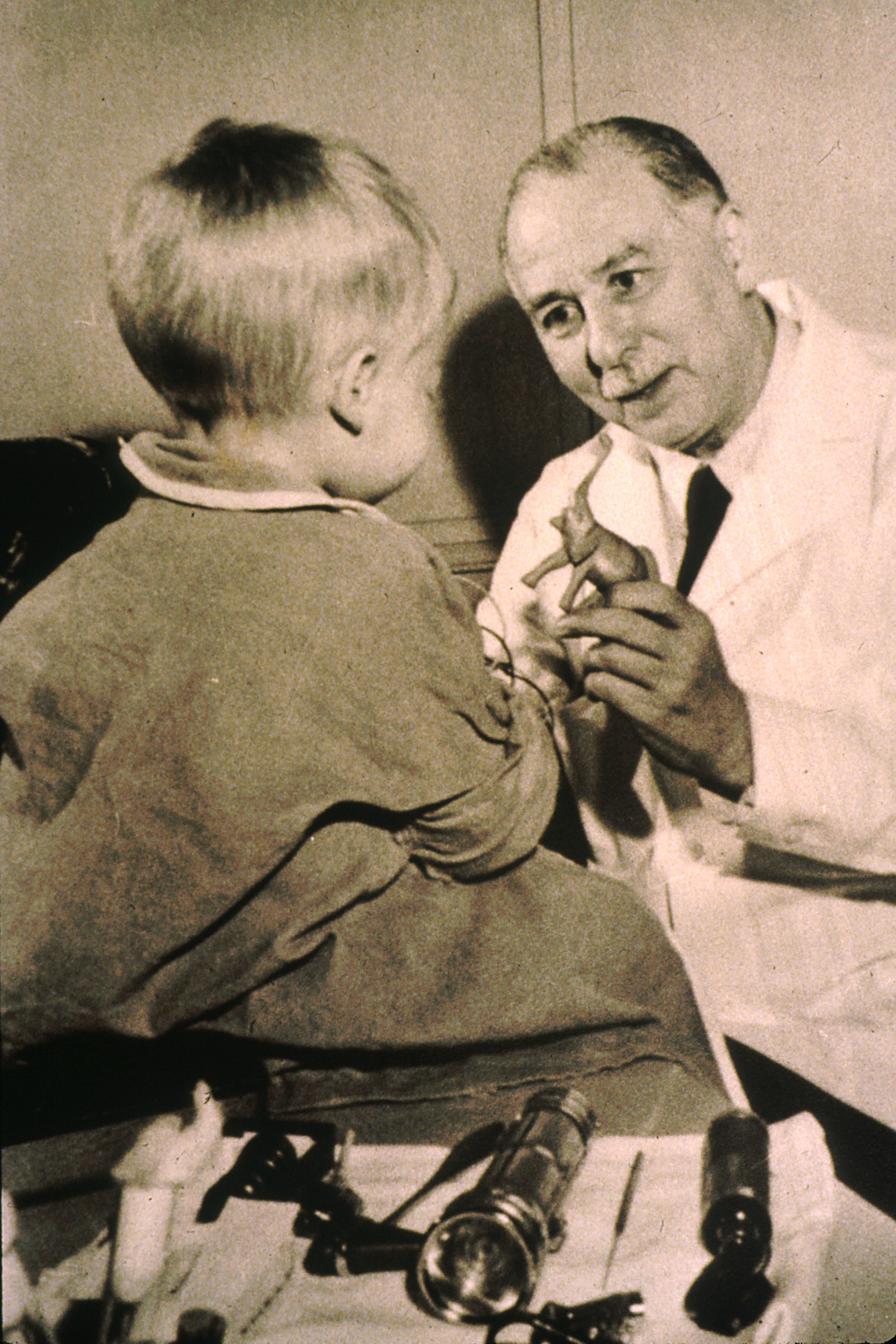
Sidney Farber is regarded as the father of modern chemotherapy.

Cancer research has been ongoing for centuries. Early research focused on the causes of cancer. Percivall Pott identified the first environmental trigger (chimney soot) for cancer in 1775 and cigarette smoking was identified as a cause of lung cancer in 1950. Early cancer treatment focused on improving surgical techniques for removing tumors. Radiation therapy took hold in the 1900s. Chemotherapeutics were developed and refined throughout the 20th century.

The U.S. declared a "war on cancer" in the 1970s, and increased the funding and support for cancer research.

=== Seminal papers ===
Some of the most highly cited and most influential research reports include:

- The Hallmarks of Cancer, published in 2000, and Hallmarks of Cancer: The Next Generation, published in 2011, by Douglas Hanahan and Robert Weinberg. Together, these articles have been cited in over 30,000 published papers.

== Types of research ==
Cancer research encompasses a variety of types and interdisciplinary areas of research. Scientists involved in cancer research may be trained in areas such as chemistry, biochemistry, molecular biology, physiology, medical physics, epidemiology, and biomedical engineering. Research performed on a foundational level is referred to as basic research and is intended to clarify scientific principles and mechanisms. Translational research aims to elucidate mechanisms of cancer development and progression and transform basic scientific findings into concepts that can be applicable to the treatment and prevention of cancer. Clinical research is devoted to the development of pharmaceuticals, surgical procedures, and medical technologies for the eventual treatment of patients.

=== Prevention and epidemiology ===
Epidemiologic analysis indicates that at least 35% of all cancer deaths in the world could now be avoided by primary prevention. According to a newer GBD systematic analysis, in 2019, ~44% of all cancer deaths — or ~4.5 million deaths or ~105 million lost disability-adjusted life years — were due to known clearly preventable risk factors, led by smoking, alcohol use and high BMI.

However, one 2015 study suggested that between ~70% and ~90% of cancers are due to environmental factors and therefore potentially preventable. Furthermore, it is estimated that with further research cancer death rates could be reduced by 70% around the world even without the development of any new therapies. Cancer prevention research receives only 2–9% of global cancer research funding, albeit many of the options for prevention are already well-known without further cancer-specific research but are not reflected in economics and policy. Mutational signatures of various cancers, for example, could reveal further causes of cancer and support causal attribution.

=== Detection ===
Prompt detection of cancer is important, since it is usually more difficult to treat in later stages. Accurate detection of cancer is also important because false positives can cause harm from unnecessary medical procedures. Some screening protocols are currently not accurate (such as prostate-specific antigen testing). Others such as a colonoscopy or mammogram are unpleasant and as a result some patients may opt out. Active research is underway to address all these problems, to develop novel ways of cancer screening and to increase detection rates.

For example:

- Multimodal learning AI systems are being developed to help detect many cancer types via integrating different types of data.
- Scientists work on identifying and measurability of novel biomarkers or sets of such to detect cancer early, such as tumor-associated mycobiomes and bacterial microbiomes
- Researchers investigate whether ants could be used as biosensors to detect cancer via urine

=== Treatment ===
Emerging topics of cancer treatment research include:

- Anti-cancer vaccines
  - Oncophage
  - Sipuleucel-T (Provenge) is a prostate cancer vaccine
  - Inactivated tumor cells are investigated as potential bifunctional cancer vaccines
- Newer forms of chemotherapy
- Gene therapy
- Photodynamic therapy
- Radiation therapy
- Reoviridae (Reolysin drug therapy)
- Targeted therapy
- Medical microbots (including bacterial), nanobots and bacterial 'cyborg cells'
- Virotherapy
- Antibodies
- Photoimmunotherapy (for brain cancer)
- Natural killer cells can induce immunological memory. Research is being developed to modify their action against cancer.
- How treatments can best be combined (in combination therapies)

=== Cause and development of cancer ===
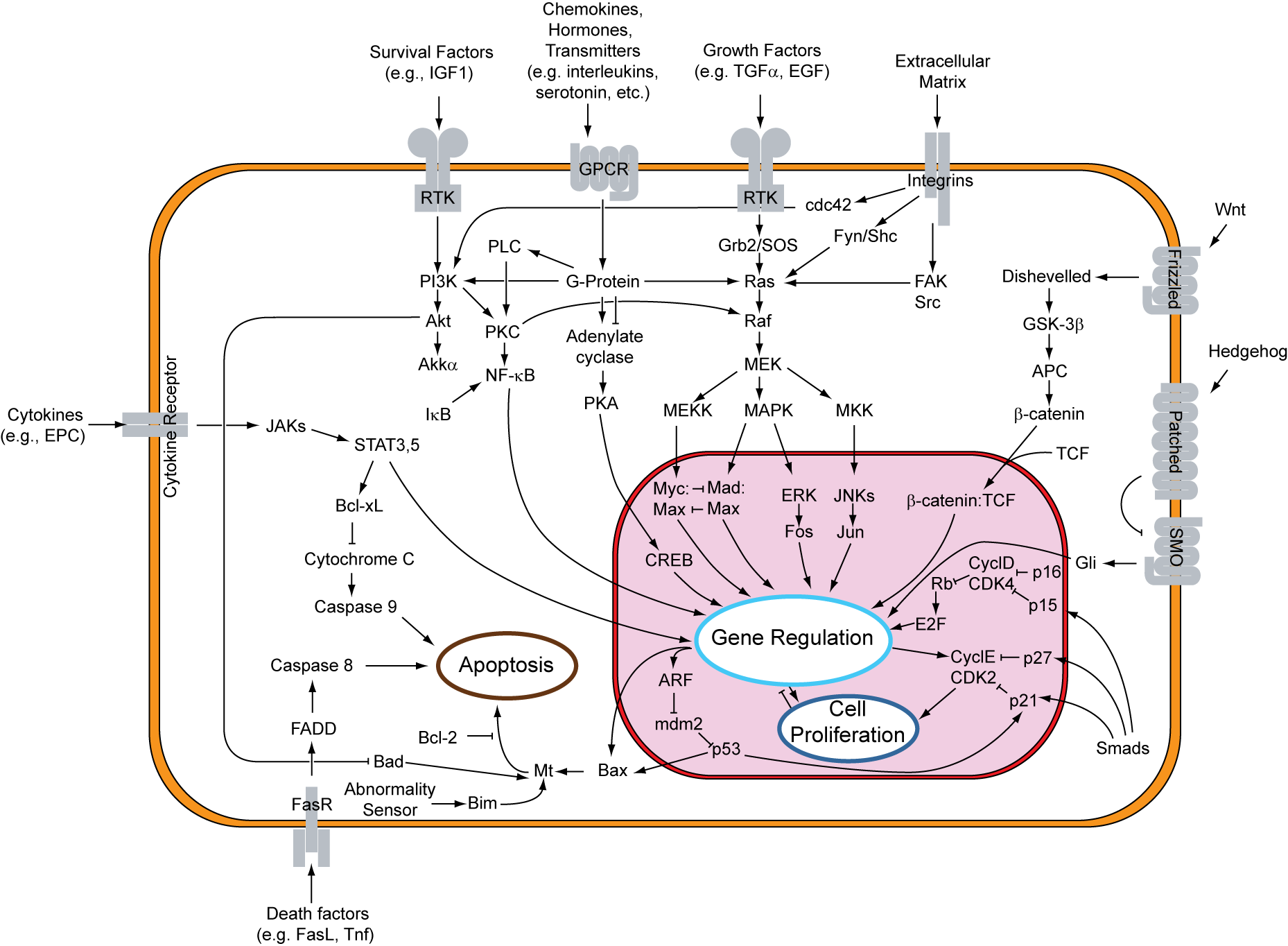
Numerous cell signaling pathways are disrupted in the development of cancer.

Research into the cause of cancer involves many different disciplines including genetics, diet, environmental factors (i.e. chemical carcinogens). In regard to investigation of causes and potential targets for therapy, the route used starts with data obtained from clinical observations, enters basic research, and, once convincing and independently confirmed results are obtained, proceeds with clinical research, involving appropriately designed trials on consenting human subjects, with the aim to test safety and efficiency of the therapeutic intervention method. An important part of basic research is characterization of the potential mechanisms of carcinogenesis, in regard to the types of genetic and epigenetic changes that are associated with cancer development. The mouse is often used as a mammalian model for manipulation of the function of genes that play a role in tumor formation, while basic aspects of tumor initiation, such as mutagenesis, are assayed on cultures of bacteria and mammalian cells.

==== Genes involved in cancer ====
The goal of oncogenomics is to identify new oncogenes or tumor suppressor genes that may provide new insights into cancer diagnosis, predicting clinical outcome of cancers, and new targets for cancer therapies. As the Cancer Genome Project stated in a 2004 review article, "a central aim of cancer research has been to identify the mutated genes that are causally implicated in oncogenesis (cancer genes)." The Cancer Genome Atlas project is a related effort investigating the genomic changes associated with cancer, while the COSMIC cancer database documents acquired genetic mutations from hundreds of thousands of human cancer samples.

These large scale projects, involving about 350 different types of cancer, have identified ~130,000 mutations in ~3000 genes that have been mutated in the tumors. The majority occurred in 319 genes, of which 286 were tumor suppressor genes and 33 oncogenes.

Several hereditary factors can increase the chance of cancer-causing mutations, including the activation of oncogenes or the inhibition of tumor suppressor genes. The functions of various onco- and tumor suppressor genes can be disrupted at different stages of tumor progression. Mutations in such genes can be used to classify the malignancy of a tumor.

In later stages, tumors can develop a resistance to cancer treatment. The identification of oncogenes and tumor suppressor genes is important to understand tumor progression and treatment success. The role of a given gene in cancer progression may vary tremendously, depending on the stage and type of cancer involved.

==== Cancer epigenetics ====
Cancer epigenetics is the study of epigenetic modifications to the DNA of cancer cells that do not involve a change in the nucleotide sequence, but instead involve a change in the way the genetic code is expressed. Epigenetic mechanisms are necessary to maintain normal sequences of tissue specific gene expression and are crucial for normal development. They may be just as important, if not even more important, than genetic mutations in a cell's transformation to cancer. The disturbance of epigenetic processes in cancers, can lead to a loss of expression of genes that occurs about 10 times more frequently by transcription silencing (caused by epigenetic promoter hypermethylation of CpG islands) than by mutations. As Vogelstein et al. points out, in a colorectal cancer there are usually about 3 to 6 driver mutations and 33 to 66 hitchhiker or passenger mutations. However, in colon tumors compared to adjacent normal-appearing colonic mucosa, there are about 600 to 800 heavily methylated CpG islands in the promoters of genes in the tumors while these CpG islands are not methylated in the adjacent mucosa. Manipulation of epigenetic alterations holds great promise for cancer prevention, detection, and therapy. In different types of cancer, a variety of epigenetic mechanisms can be perturbed, such as the silencing of tumor suppressor genes and activation of oncogenes by altered CpG island methylation patterns, histone modifications, and dysregulation of DNA binding proteins. There are several medications which have epigenetic impact, that are now used in a number of these diseases.

== Diet and cancer ==
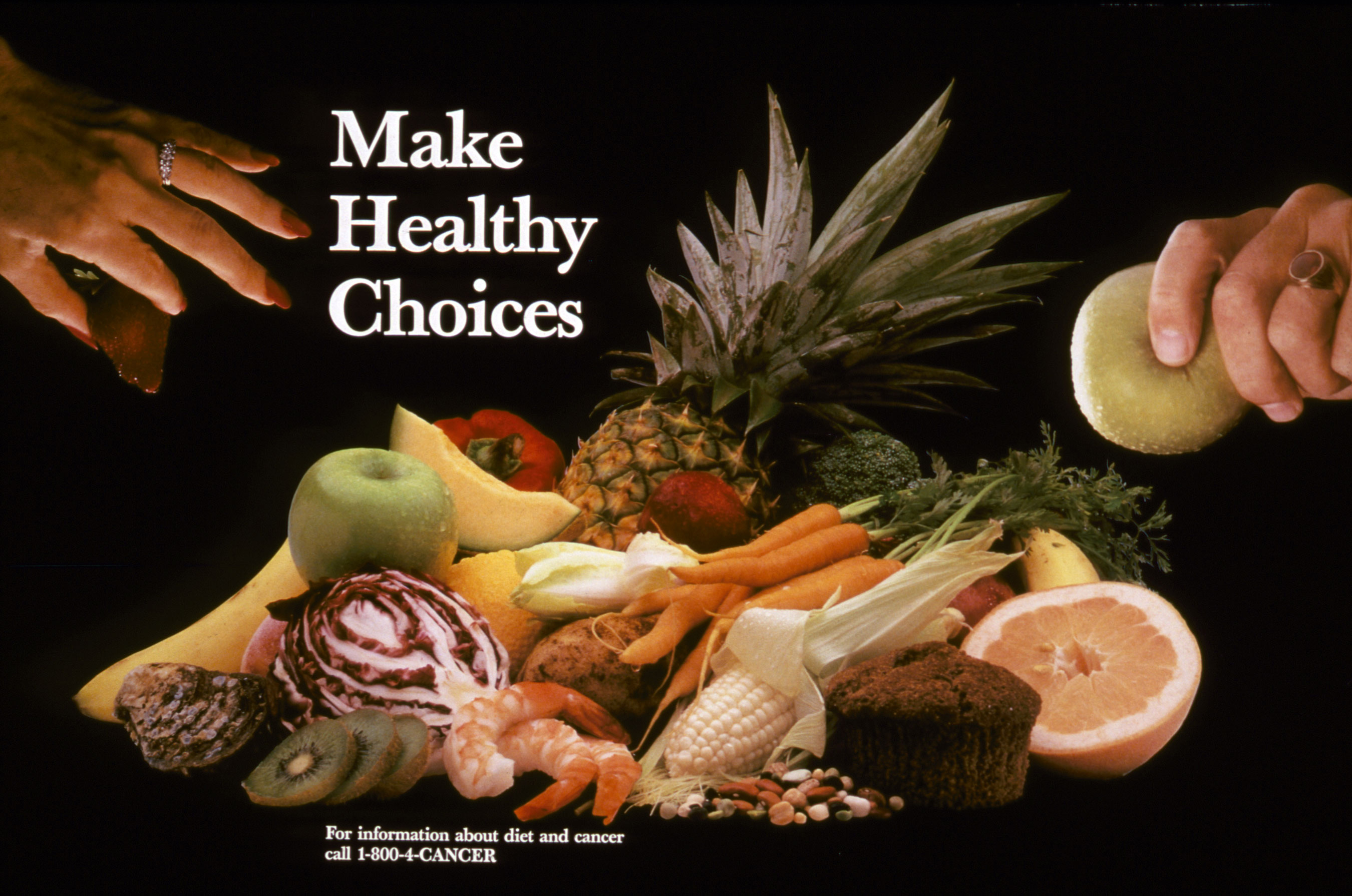
Advertisement suggesting that a healthy diet helps prevent cancer

Many dietary recommendations have been proposed to reduce the risk of cancer, few have significant supporting scientific evidence. Obesity and drinking alcohol have been correlated with the incidence and progression of some cancers. Lowering the consumption of sweetened beverages is recommended as a measure to address obesity.

Some specific foods are linked to specific cancers. There is strong evidence that processed meat and red meat intake increases risk of colorectal cancer. Aflatoxin B_{1}, a frequent food contaminant, increases risk of liver cancer, while drinking coffee is associated with a reduced risk. Betel nut chewing causes oral cancer. Stomach cancer is more common in Japan due to its high-salt diet.

Dietary recommendations for cancer prevention typically include weight management and eating a healthy diet, consisting mainly of "vegetables, fruit, whole grains and fish, and a reduced intake of red meat, animal fat, and refined sugar." A healthy dietary pattern may lower cancer risk by 10–20%. There is no clinical evidence that diets or specific foods can cure cancer.

Periods of intermittent fasting (time-restricted feeding which may not include caloric restriction) is investigated for potential usefulness in cancer prevention and treatment and as of 2021 additional trials are needed to elucidate the risks and benefits. In some cases, "caloric restrictions could hinder both cancer growth and progression, besides enhancing the efficacy of chemotherapy and radiation therapy". Caloric restriction mimetics, including some present in foods like spermidine, are also investigated for these or similar reasons. Such and similar dietary supplements may contribute to prevention or treatment, with candidate substances including apigenin, berberine, jiaogulan, and rhodiola rosea.

== Research funding ==
Cancer research is funded by government grants, charitable foundations and pharmaceutical and biotechnology companies.

In the early 2000s, most funding for cancer research came from taxpayers and charities, rather than from corporations. In the US, less than 30% of all cancer research was funded by commercial researchers such as pharmaceutical companies. Per capita, public spending on cancer research by taxpayers and charities in the US was five times as much in 2002–03 as public spending by taxpayers and charities in the 15 countries that were full members of the European Union. As a percentage of GDP, the non-commercial funding of cancer research in the US was four times the amount dedicated to cancer research in Europe. Half of Europe's non-commercial cancer research is funded by charitable organizations.

The National Cancer Institute is the major funding institution in the United States. In the 2023 fiscal year, the NCI funded $7.1 billion in cancer research.

== Difficulties ==
Difficulties inherent to cancer research are shared with many types of biomedical research.

Cancer research processes have been criticised. These include, especially in the US, for the financial resources and positions required to conduct research. Other consequences of competition for research resources appear to be a substantial number of research publications whose results cannot be replicated.

=== Replicability ===
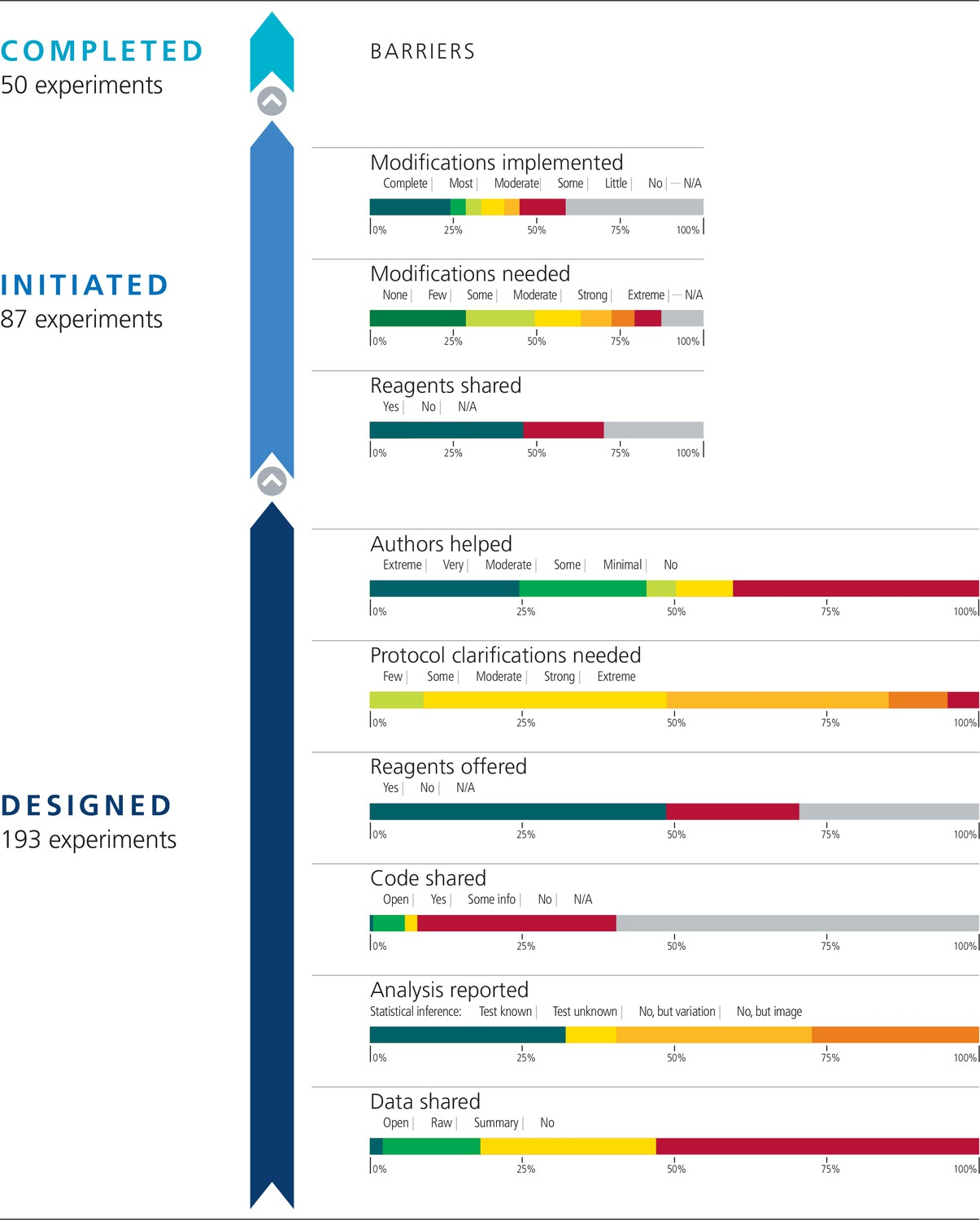
Results from The Reproducibility Project: Cancer Biology suggest most studies of the cancer research sector may not be replicable.

In a 2012 paper, C. Glenn Begley, a biotech consultant working at Amgen, and Lee Ellis, a medical researcher at the University of Texas, found that only 11% of 53 pre-clinical cancer studies had replications that confirmed the original studies' conclusions. In late 2021, The Reproducibility Project: Cancer Biology examined 53 top papers about cancer published between 2010 and 2012 and showed that, among studies that provided sufficient information to be redone, effect sizes were 85% smaller on average than the original findings. A survey of cancer researchers found that half of them had been unable to reproduce a published result. Another report estimated that almost half of randomized controlled trials contained flawed data (based on the analysis of anonymized individual participant data (IPD) from more than 150 trials).

== Public participation ==
=== Distributed computing ===
One can share computer time for distributed cancer research projects like Help Conquer Cancer. World Community Grid also had a project called Help Defeat Cancer. Other related projects include the Folding@home and Rosetta@home projects, which focus on groundbreaking protein folding and protein structure prediction research. Vodafone has also partnered with the Garvan Institute to create the DreamLab Project, which uses distributed computing via an app on cellphones to perform cancer research.

=== Clinical trials ===
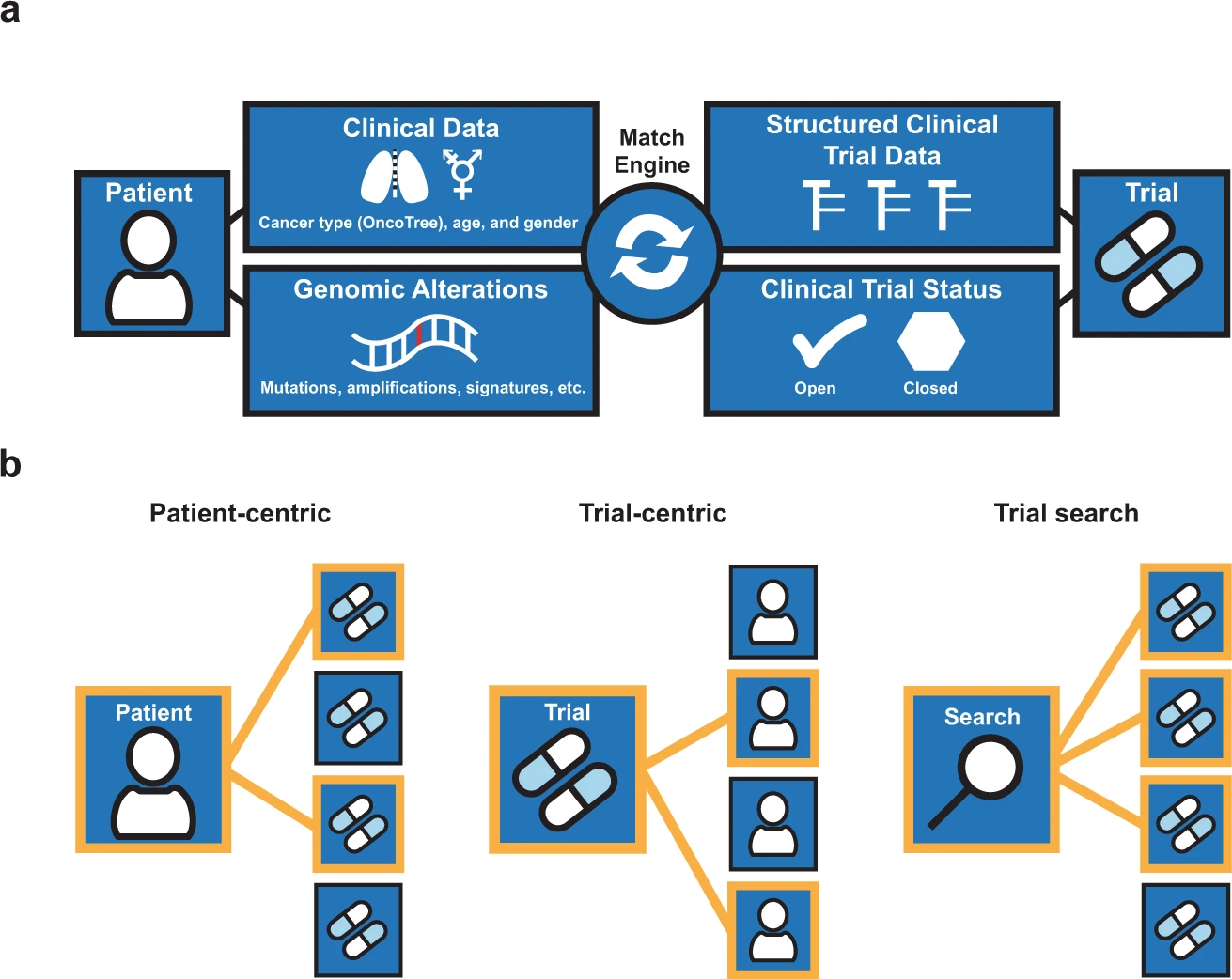
MatchMiner overview of data flow and modes of use

Members of the public can also join clinical trials as healthy control subjects or for methods of cancer detection.

There could be software and data-related procedures that increase participation in trials and make them faster and less expensive. One open source platform matches genomically profiled cancer patients to precision medicine drug trials.

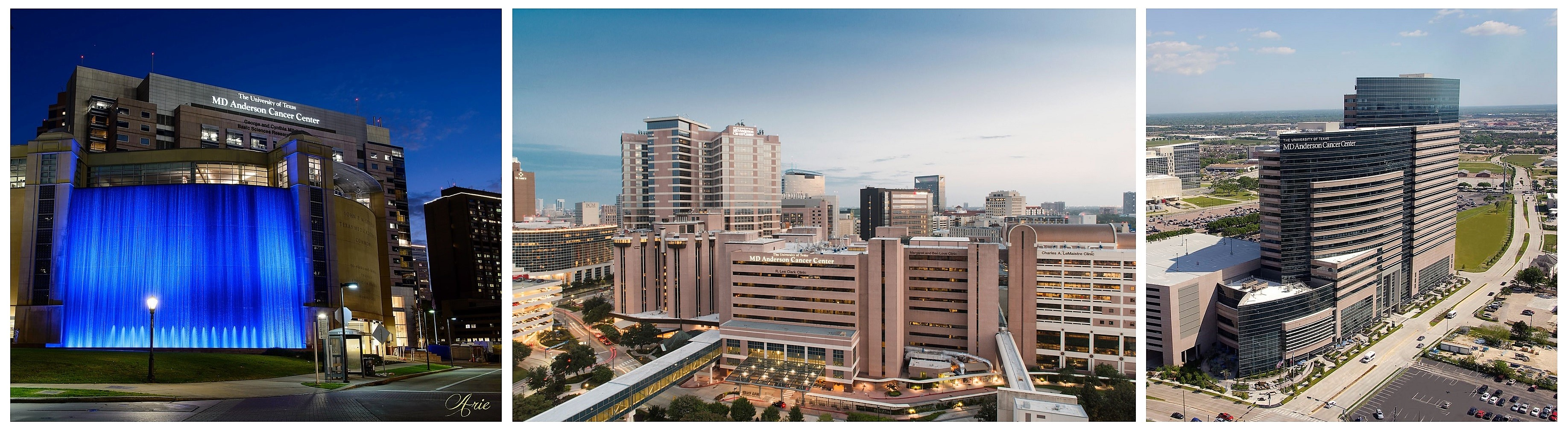
MD Anderson Cancer Center is ranked as one of the top cancer research institutions.

== Organizations ==
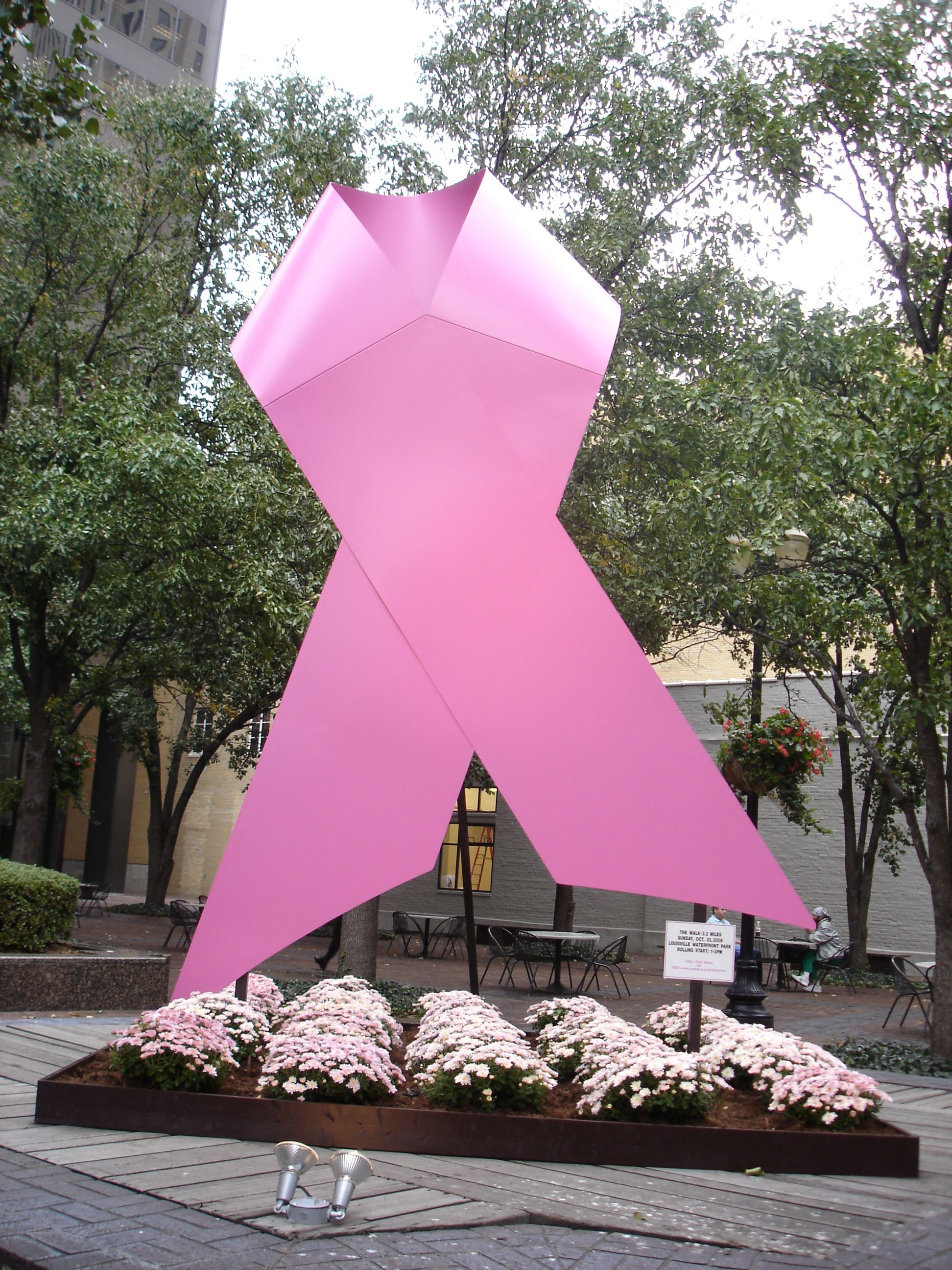
Breast cancer awareness ribbon statue in Kentucky

Organizations exist as associations for scientists participating in cancer research, such as the American Association for Cancer Research and American Society of Clinical Oncology, and as foundations for public awareness or raising funds for cancer research, such as Relay For Life and the American Cancer Society.

=== Awareness campaigns ===
Supporters of different types of cancer have adopted different colored awareness ribbons and promote months of the year as being dedicated to the support of specific types of cancer. The American Cancer Society began promoting October as Breast Cancer Awareness Month in the United States in the 1980s. Pink products are sold to both generate awareness and raise money to be donated for research purposes. This has led to pinkwashing, or the selling of ordinary products turned pink as a promotion for the company.

== See also ==
- Exposome
