= Rescue fusion hybridization =

Rescue fusion hybridization is a process used to manufacture some therapeutic cancer vaccines in which individual tumor cells obtained through biopsy are fused with an antibody-secreting cell to form a heterohybridoma. This cell then secretes the unique idiotype, or immunoglobulin antigen characteristic of the individual tumor, which is purified for use as the vaccine. It is used to produce the BiovaxID vaccine for follicular lymphoma.
