= Cancer prevention =

Taking measures to decrease cancer incidence

Cancer prevention is the practice of taking active measures to decrease the incidence of cancer and mortality. The practice of prevention depends on both individual efforts to improve lifestyle and seek preventive screening, and socioeconomic or public policy related to cancer prevention. Globalized cancer prevention is regarded as a critical objective due to its applicability to large populations, reducing long term effects of cancer by promoting proactive health practices and behaviors, and its perceived cost-effectiveness and viability for all socioeconomic classes.

The majority of cancer cases are due to the accumulation of environmental pollution being inherited as epigenetic damage and most of these environmental factors are controllable lifestyle choices. Greater than a reported 75% of cancer deaths could be prevented by avoiding risk factors including: tobacco, overweight / obesity, an insufficient diet, physical inactivity, alcohol, sexually transmitted infections, and air pollution. Not all environmental causes are controllable, such as naturally occurring background radiation, and other cases of cancer are caused through hereditary genetic disorders. Current genetic engineering techniques under development may serve as preventive measures in the future. Future preventive screening measures can be additionally improved by minimizing invasiveness and increasing specificity by taking individual biological makeup into account, also known as "population-based personalized cancer screening."

Death rate adjusted for age for malignant cancer per 100,000 inhabitants in 2004: No data ≤ 55 55–80 80–105 105–130 130–155 155–180 / 180–205 205–230 230–255 255–280 280–305 ≥ 305

While anyone can get cancer, age is one of the biggest factors that increases the risk of cancer: 3 out of 4 cancers are found in people aged 55 or older.

== Risk reduction ==
=== Dietary ===
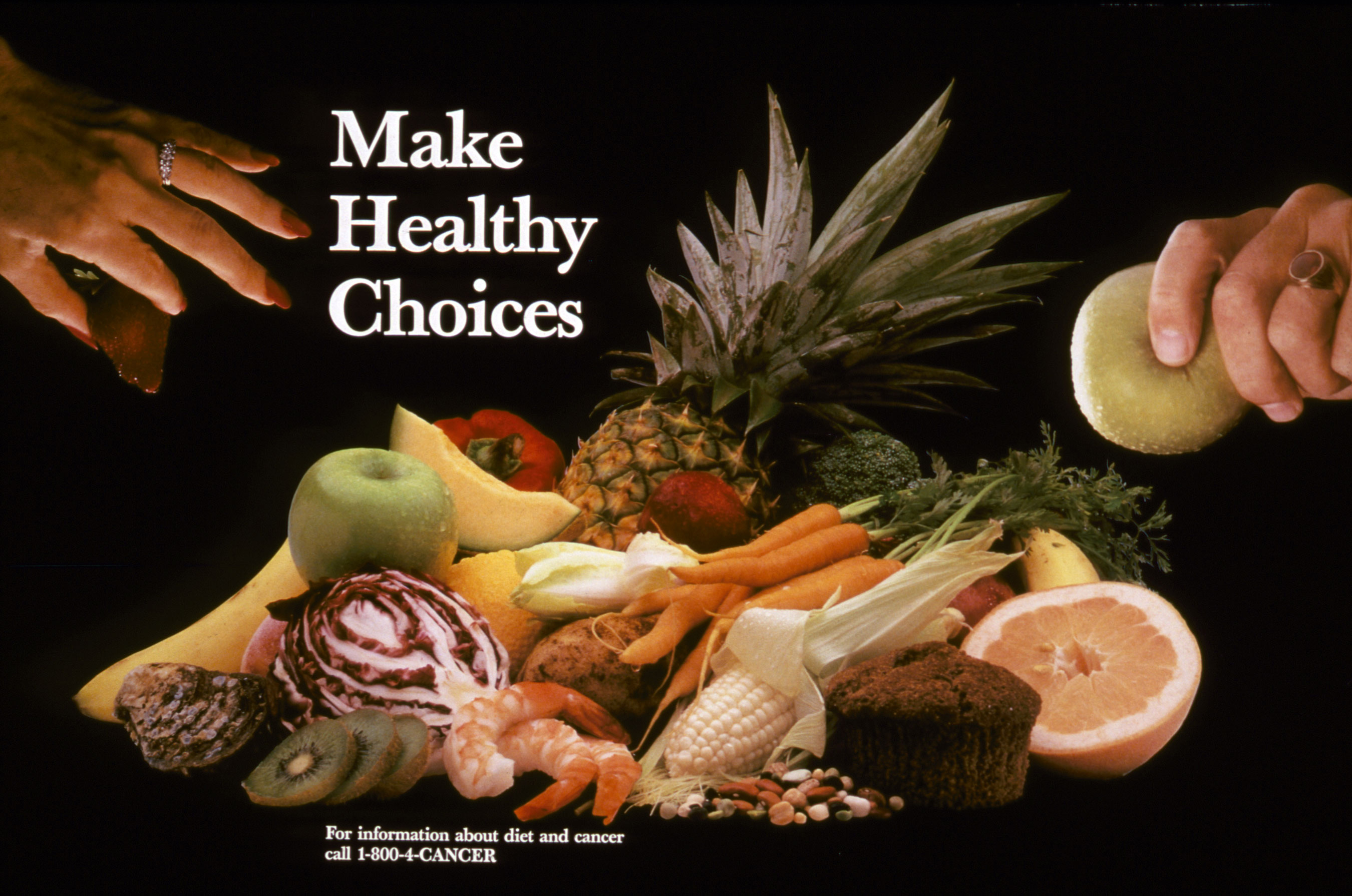
Advertisement for a healthy diet to possibly reduce cancer risk

An average 35% of human cancer mortality is attributed to the diet of the individual. Studies have linked excessive consumption of red or processed meat to an increased risk of breast cancer, colon cancer, and pancreatic cancer, a phenomenon which could be due to the presence of carcinogens in meats cooked at high temperatures. One review found increased risk of breast cancer to be associated with a higher intake of red and processed meats, eggs, refined sugars, alcohol, and saturated fats.

Dietary recommendations for reducing cancer risk typically include an emphasis on vegetables, fruit, whole grains, and fish, and an avoidance of processed and red meat (beef, pork, lamb), animal fats, and refined carbohydrates. The World Cancer Research Fund recommends a diet rich in fruits and vegetables to reduce the risk of cancer. A diet rich in foods of plant origin, including non-starchy fruits and vegetables, non-starchy roots and tubers, and whole grains, may have protective effects against cancer.

Consumption of coffee is associated with a reduced risk of liver cancer and endometrial cancer. High coffee intake was shown to be related to a lower risk of melanoma and oral cancer. However, a higher risk of childhood acute lymphocytic leukemia and bladder cancer was associated with higher coffee intake. Substituting processed foods, such as biscuits, cakes or white bread – which are high in fat, sugars and refined starches – with a plant-based diet may reduce the risk of cancer. In some cases, plant-based diets have shown to be inversely associated with overall cancer risk.

While many dietary recommendations have been proposed to reduce the risk of cancer, the evidence to support them is not definitive. Factors that may increase risk are alcohol consumption, and a diet low in fruits and vegetables and high in red meat. A 2014 meta-analysis did not find a relationship between consuming fruits and vegetables and reduced cancer risk.

=== Physical activity ===
Research shows that regular physical activity may help to reduce cancer up to 30%, with up to 300 minutes per week of moderate to vigorous intensity of physical activity recommended.

Possible mechanisms by which physical activity may reduce cancer risk include lowering levels of estrogen and insulin, reducing inflammation, and strengthening the immune system. Regular physical activity activates tumor suppressor genes like p53, reduces cell proliferation to prevent tumor development, increases apoptosis or cell death in tumor tissue, and can reduce obesity-related cancer risk, as obesity is associated with increased risk of many types of cancer.

=== Medication and supplements ===
In the general population, NSAIDs reduce the risk of colorectal cancer; however, due to the cardiovascular and gastrointestinal side effects, they cause overall harm when used to lower cancer risk. Aspirin use after a cancer diagnosis is associated with about a 20% reduction in cancer mortality. COX-2 inhibitors may decrease the rate of polyp formation in people with familial adenomatous polyposis however are associated with the same adverse effects as NSAIDs. Daily use of tamoxifen or raloxifene has been demonstrated to reduce the risk of developing breast cancer in high-risk women. The benefit verses harm for 5-alpha-reductase inhibitor such as finasteride is not clear.

Vitamins supplements have not been found to be effective at reducing overall cancer risk, although observational studies consistently show that low blood levels of vitamin D are correlated with increased cancer risk. Whether this relationship is causal and vitamin D supplementation is protective is not determined. Beta-carotene supplementation has been found to increase lung cancer rates in those who are at high risk. Folic acid supplementation has not been found effective in preventing colon cancer and may increase colon polyps. A 2018 systematic review concluded that selenium has no beneficial effect in reducing the risk of cancer based on high quality evidence.

=== Avoidance of carcinogens ===
The United States National Toxicology Program identified the chemical substances as known human carcinogens in its 15th Report on Carcinogens in 2022. Simply because a substance has been designated as a carcinogen, however, does not mean that the substance will necessarily cause cancer. Many factors influence whether a person exposed to a carcinogen will develop cancer, including the amount and duration of the exposure and the individual's genetic background.

Updated evaluations by the International Agency for Research on Cancer support the carcinogenicity of asbestos and benzene, while also guiding the assessment of emerging substances in consumer products. A 2023 meta-analysis found that exposure to certain compounds suspected of endocrine disruption, including p,p′-DDT (and its metabolite p,p′-DDE) and several polychlorinated biphenyl variants, was associated with increased risk of breast cancer.

The International Agency for Research on Cancer classifies known, suspected or potential carcinogens into the following categories: Group 1 carcinogens, where sufficient evidence exists to support carcinogenicity in humans, Group 2A for probable carcinogens, Group 2B for possible carcinogens and group 3 for agents, chemical mixtures or exposure events not classifiable as either carcinogens or non-carcinogens due to inadequate evidence in humans or non-human animals. Group 4 is for non-carcinogens where strong evidence exists to support a lack of carcinogenicity.

=== Genetic and epigenetic factors ===
Genetic factors play a significant role in cancer risk, adding to the influence of modifiable environmental factors. Specific gene polymorphisms are associated with increased cancer risk. For instance, variations in the vitamin D receptor (VDR) gene are associated with elevated risks of both breast and ovarian cancers, suggesting that impaired vitamin D signaling may contribute to carcinogenesis. Similarly, inherited variations in the enzymes that contribute to the metabolism of carcinogens have been linked with an increased risk of colorectal cancer, demonstrating how genetic differences can affect the capacity of the body to break down cancer-causing substances. In addition to these inherited factors, environmental exposures can also alter gene regulation through epigenetic modifications. A systematic review on epigenetics, microbiota, and breast cancer revealed that factors like maternal diet and stress may alter epigenetic markers and impact the development and progression of breast cancer. Research on gene-environment interactions in colorectal cancer identified that lifestyle factors – such as the intake of processed meats, alcohol consumption, and the use of aspirin – affect cancer risk in individuals of specific genetic backgrounds, with aspirin's protective effects varying according to genetic makeup.

=== Vaccination ===
Anti-cancer vaccines can be preventive or be used as therapeutic treatment. All such vaccines incite adaptive immunity by enhancing cytotoxic T lymphocyte (CTL) recognition and activity against tumor-associated or tumor-specific antigens (TAA and TSAs).

Vaccines have been developed that prevent infection by some carcinogenic viruses. Human papillomavirus vaccine (Gardasil and Cervarix) decreases the risk of developing cervical cancer. The hepatitis B vaccine prevents infection with hepatitis B virus and thus decreases the risk of liver cancer. The administration of human papillomavirus and hepatitis B vaccinations is recommended when resources allow.

Some cancer vaccines are usually immunoglobulin-based and target antigens specific to cancer or abnormal human cells. These vaccines may be given to treat cancer during the progression of disease to boost the immune system's ability to recognize and attack cancer antigens as foreign entities. Antibodies for cancer cell vaccines may be taken from the patient's own body (autologous vaccine) or from another patient (allogeneic vaccine). Several autologous vaccines, such as Oncophage for kidney cancer and Vitespen for a variety of cancers, have either been released or are undergoing clinical trial. FDA-approved vaccines, such as Sipuleucel-T for metastasizing prostate cancer or Nivolumab for melanoma and lung cancer can act either by targeting over-expressed or mutated proteins or by temporarily inhibiting immune checkpoints to boost immune activity.

=== Screening ===
Screening procedures, commonly sought for more prevalent cancers, such as colon, breast, and cervical, have greatly improved in the past few decades from advances in biomarker identification and detection. Early detection of pancreatic cancer biomarkers was accomplished using a SERS-based immunoassay approach. A SERS-based multiplex protein biomarker detection platform in a microfluidic chip can be used to detect several protein biomarkers to predict the type of disease and critical biomarkers and increase the chance of diagnosis between diseases with similar biomarkers (e.g. pancreatic cancer, ovarian cancer, and pancreatitis).

To improve the chances of detecting cancer early, all eligible people should take advantage of cancer screening services. However, overall uptake of cancer screening among the general population is not widespread, especially among disadvantaged groups (e.g. those with low income, mental illnesses, or are from different ethnic groups) who face different barriers that lead to lower attendance rates. Research indicates that these screening barriers are influenced by both individual circumstances and area-level factors. A systematic review of lung cancer screenings found that feelings of fear, anxiety, and negative attitudes toward the screening process can discourage individuals from participating. Additionally, a review examining clinical and psychosocial aspects associated with breast, cervical, and colorectal cancer screening found that factors like personal beliefs, social support, and effective communication with healthcare providers are associated with screening attendance.

Beyond the personal and psychosocial factors, broader socioeconomic elements also impact screening participation rates. Women with lower income are 20% more likely to not participate in breast cancer screening, with lower education increasing the likelihood of skipping screening by 18%. Immigrant women have nearly triple the odds of non-participation, and individuals living further away from their assigned screening facility, as well as those with a male family doctor, are also less likely to participate in screening. Rural communities often face significant transportation barriers, with long travel distances and limited access to public transportation further reducing access to screening services. In addition, in these rural areas, the uneven distribution of healthcare providers and limited availability of telehealth services can exacerbate these disparities, reducing access to specialized cancer screening.

=== Health literacy ===
Health literacy – the ability to navigate and use health care information – is an important factor in cancer prevention. Studies show that individuals with better health literacy are more likely to follow through with cancer screening programs for breast, cervical, and colorectal cancers. Some intervention programs aimed at improving health literacy are shown to not only boost understanding of health information but also address psychosocial aspects, such as patient communication and decision conflict. These interventions include patient decision aids, multimedia educational tools, and clinician communication training, which are linked to improvements in patient knowledge, risk perception, and comfortability with screening processes. Enhancing health literacy by addressing patients' informational and emotional needs may help to reduce disparities in cancer prevention.

==== Cervical cancer ====
Cervical cancer is usually screened through in vitro examination of the cells of the cervix (e.g. Pap smear), colposcopy, or direct inspection of the cervix (after application of dilute acetic acid), or testing for HPV, the oncogenic virus that is the necessary cause of cervical cancer. Screening is recommended for women over 21 years, initially women between 21 and 29 years old are encouraged to receive Pap smear screens every three years, and those over 29 every five years. For women older than the age of 65 and with no history of cervical cancer or abnormality, and with an appropriate precedence of negative Pap test results may cease regular screening.

Still, adherence to recommended screening plans depends on age and may be linked to "educational level, culture, psychosocial issues, and marital status," further emphasizing the importance of addressing these challenges in regards to cancer screening.

==== Colorectal cancer ====
Colorectal cancer is most often screened with the fecal occult blood test (FOBT). Variants of this test include guaiac-based FOBT (gFOBT), the fecal immunochemical test (FIT), and stool DNA testing (sDNA). Further testing includes flexible sigmoidoscopy (FS), total colonoscopy (TC), or computed tomography (CT) scans if a total colonoscopy is non-ideal. The recommended age at which to begin and continue screening is 50–75 years. However, this is highly dependent on medical history and exposure to risk factors for colorectal cancer. Effective screening has been shown to reduce the incidence of colorectal cancer by 33% and colorectal cancer mortality by 43%.

==== Breast cancer ====
The estimated number of new breast cancer cases in the US in 2018 is predicted to be more than 1.7 million, with more than six hundred thousand deaths. Factors such as breast size, reduced physical activity, obesity and overweight status, infertility and never having had children, hormone replacement therapy (HRT), and genetics are risk factors for breast cancer. Mammograms are widely used to screen for breast cancer, and are recommended for women 50–74 years of age by the US Preventive Services Task Force (USPSTF). However, the USPSTF does not recommend mammograms for women 40–49 years old due to the possibility of overdiagnosis.

== Breast cancer ==
Breast cancer is a leading cause of death for women worldwide.

=== Physical activity ===
Physical activity may be a preventive factor to reduce the risk, recurrence and mortality in relation to breast cancer. Physical activity and body mass index (BMI) are interrelated by how physical activity may help decrease BMI, which has also shown to be a breast cancer prevention factor. A meta-analysis concluded that women who had higher levels of physical activity showed a possible lower risk for breast cancer recurrence and an overall lower risk of mortality from breast cancer. Physical activity reduces insulin levels, thereby lowering the risk of cancer recurrence and mortality, especially in breast cancer, where hyperinsulinemia supports residual tumor growth and increases the availability of sex hormones that stimulate cell proliferation.

=== Mediterranean diet ===
Some research shows that following the Mediterranean diet could help lower breast cancer risk, particularly among women who are postmenopausal. However, other studies have not found an association between the diet and breast cancer risk. This diet includes foods such as various whole grains, nuts, beans, vegetables, fruits, herbs, spices, and olive oil as well as focusing on eating lean sources of meat, such as fish and poultry.

In some studies, there has been an inverse association between breast cancer risk and whole grain consumption.

== Preventable causes of cancer ==
As of 2017, tobacco use, diet and nutrition, physical activity, obesity/overweight status, infectious agents, and chemical and physical carcinogens have been reported to be the leading areas where cancer prevention can be practiced through enacting positive lifestyle changes, getting appropriate regular screening, and getting vaccinated.

An analysis published in 2026, led by researchers at the International Agency for Research on Cancer, drew on GLOBOCAN data for 36 cancer sites in 185 countries. It estimated that 7.1 million of the 18.7 million new cancer cases in 2022 (37.8%) were attributable to 30 modifiable risk factors, with smoking and infections the leading contributors.

The development of many common cancers are incited by such risk factors. For example, consumption of tobacco and alcohol, a medical history of genital warts and STDs, immunosuppression, unprotected sex, and early age of first sexual intercourse and pregnancy all may serve as risk factors for cervical cancer. Obesity, red meat or processed meat consumption, tobacco and alcohol, and a medical history of inflammatory bowel diseases are all risk factors for colorectal cancer (CRC). On the other hand, exercise and consumption of vegetables may help decrease the risk of CRC.

Several preventable causes of cancer were highlighted in Doll and Peto's landmark 1981 study, estimating that 75 – 80% of cancers in the United States could be prevented by avoidance of 11 different factors. A more recent review of Doll and Peto's work confirmed that most of these estimates remain relevant today. In addition, a 2013 review of more recent cancer prevention literature by Schottenfeld et al., summarizing studies reported between 2000 and 2010, points to most of the same avoidable factors identified by Doll and Peto. However, Schottenfeld et al. considered fewer factors (e.g. non inclusion of diet) in their review than Doll and Peto, and indicated that avoidance of these fewer factors would result in prevention of 60% of cancer deaths. The table below indicates the proportions of cancer deaths attributed to different factors, summarizing the observations of Doll and Peto, Shottenfeld et al. and several other authors, and shows the influence of major lifestyle factors on the prevention of cancer, such as tobacco, an unhealthy diet, obesity and infections.

Proportions of cancer deaths in the United States attributed to different factors
Factor	Doll & Peto	Schottenfeld et al.	Other reports
Tobacco	30%	30%	38% men, 23% women, 30%, 25-30%
Unhealthy diet	32%	-	20%, 10%, 10%-20%
Obesity	*	10%	14% women, 20% men, among non-smokers, 10-20%, 19-20% United States, 16-18% Great Britain, 13% Brazil, 11-12% China
Infection†	10%	5-8%	7-10%, 8% developed nations, 26% developing nations, 10% high income, 25% African
Alcohol	3%	3-4%	3.6%, 8% USA, 20% France
Occupational exposures	4%	3-5%	2-10%, may be 15-20% in men
Radiation (solar and ionizing)	3%	3-4%	up to 10%
Physical inactivity	*	<5%	7%
Reproductive and sexual behavior	1-13%	-	-
Pollution	2%	-	-
Medicines and medical procedures	1%	-	-
Industrial products	<1%	-	-
Food additives	<1%	-	-

*Included in diet

†Carcinogenic infections include: for the uterine cervix (human papillomavirus [HPV]), liver (hepatitis B virus [HBV] and hepatitis C virus [HCV]), stomach (Helicobacter pylori [H pylori]), lymphoid tissues (Epstein-Barr virus [EBV]), nasopharynx (EBV), urinary bladder (Schistosoma hematobium), and biliary tract (Opisthorchis viverrini, Clonorchis sinensis)

== History of cancer prevention ==
Cancer has been thought to be a preventable disease since the time of Roman physician Galen, who observed that an unhealthy diet was correlated with cancer incidence. In 1713, Italian physician Ramazzini hypothesized that abstinence caused lower rates of cervical cancer in nuns. Further observation in the 18th century led to the discovery that certain chemicals, such as tobacco, soot and tar (leading to scrotal cancer in chimney sweeps, as reported by Percivall Pott in 1775), could serve as carcinogens for humans. Although Pott suggested preventive measures for chimney sweeps (wearing clothes to prevent contact bodily contact with soot), his suggestions were only put into practice in Holland, resulting in decreasing rates of scrotal cancer in chimney sweeps. Later, the 19th century brought on the onset of the classification of chemical carcinogens.

In the early 20th century, physical and biological carcinogens, such as X-ray radiation or the Rous Sarcoma Virus discovered 1911, were identified. Despite observed correlation of environmental or chemical factors with cancer development, there was a deficit of formal prevention research and lifestyle changes for cancer prevention were not feasible during this time.

In Europe, in 1987 the European Commission launched the European Code Against Cancer to help educate the public about actions they can take to reduce their risk of getting cancer. The first version of the code covered 10 recommendations covering tobacco, alcohol, diet, weight, sun exposure, exposure to known carcinogens, early detection and participation in organized breast and cervical cancer screening programs. In the early 1990s, the European School of Oncology led a review of the code and added details about the scientific evidence behind each of the recommendations. Later updates were coordinated by the International Agency for Research on Cancer. The fourth edition of the code, , developed in 2012‒2013, also includes recommendations on participation in vaccination programs for hepatitis B (infants) and human papillomavirus (girls), breast feeding and hormone replacement therapy, and participation in organized colorectal cancer screening programs.

== See also ==
- ATSDR
- BRCA1 and BRCA2 (DNA repair proteins.) Tests for specific genetic mutations determine cancer susceptibility.
- Cancer alley
- Cancer cluster
- Microplastics and human health
- Human genetic enhancement
- International Agency for Research on Cancer
- Preventive healthcare
- Superfund
- The Cancer Prevention and Treatment Fund
- World Cancer Day
