= Biovest =

Minneapolis-based biotechnology company

Biovest International
- Type: Public
- Industry: Biomedicine
- Headquarters: Minneapolis, MN, United States
- Key people: Dr. Rebecca Thompson (Chief Executive Officer)
- Products: BiovaxID (dasiprotimut-T)
- Services: Autologus active immunotherapy (cancer vaccines)
- Number of employees: 50
- Website: www.cellculturecompany.com

Biovest International, Inc (OTCQB: BVTI) was a Minneapolis-based biotechnology company. Their active immunotherapy, BiovaxID, is a cancer vaccine whose first indication was intended to be consolidation/adjuvant therapy of follicular Non-Hodgkin's Lymphoma. Biovest filed to reorganize under chapter 11 bankruptcy in 2008 and 2013, BiovaxID was refused European marketing authorization in 2015, and Biovest's stock listing was revoked in 2017.

== BiovaxID (dasiprotimut-T) ==
Unlike a preventative vaccine, such as for measles or mumps, BiovaxID is administered as a therapeutic cancer vaccine, designed to stimulate and "train" the patient's immune system to respond and attack cancerous cells, even long after therapy has been stopped — each vaccine being unique to that particular patient. Beginning with an excisional (>2 cm) lymph node biopsy, tumor cells are fused with Biovest's proprietary mouse/human heterohybridoma in order to induce secretion of normally surface-bound tumor immunoglobulin (idiotype or Id). Id-secreting clones are identified by a bioinformatics approach which confirms a match of each vaccine's unique idiotype sequence to the tumor's after which they are cultured (expanded) in a personal-scale, disposable hollow-fiber AutovaxID™ bioreactor system. In this manner, each vaccine is highly-specifically matched to highly-unique segments of the patient's tumor genome. During culture, supernatant (containing idiotype) is collected until sufficient amounts have been produced to yield adequate dosage of vaccine. This supernatant is purified by affinity chromatography and conjugated (bonded) to keyhole limpet haemocyanin (KLH), an immune-stimulating carrier protein, resulting in a finished vaccine that can be shipped and administered to patients. In the Phase III clinical trial, manufacturing success was approximately 95% of treated patients.

The BiovaxID vaccine is manufactured using a process known as rescue fusion hybridization. It is personalized based on a tissue biopsy obtained from a patient's tumor. The vaccine targets a tumor-specific protein known as an idiotype, which is expressed on malignant B cells. The idiotype protein is linked to keyhole limpet hemocyanin (KLH) and administered with granulocyte-macrophage colony-stimulating factor (GM-CSF) as an adjuvant. This approach is intended to stimulate an immune response directed against tumor cells expressing the idiotype. Clinical studies have evaluated its potential role in the treatment of follicular lymphoma.

BiovaxID obtained Orphan drug status with the FDA and has obtained positive Phase III clinical trial results. After a median follow-up of 4.71 years (56.6 months, range: 12.6 - 89.3 months), the median disease-free survival in the BiovaxID arm was 44.2 months compared with 30.6 months in the control arm, which is a clinically and statistically significant difference (adj. p=0.029). Among the 75 patients receiving BiovaxID in the study, 35 received BiovaxID manufactured with an IgM isotype and 40 received BiovaxID manufactured with an IgG isotype with each treatment vaccine produced to correspond with the patient's tumor immunoglobulin isotype. Of 40 patients receiving control, 25 had tumors with IgM isotype and 15 had tumors with IgG isotype. Two of the patients in the vaccinated treatment/control population had a tumor with mixed IgM/IgG isotypes and were excluded from this analysis. Among 35 patients with IgM tumor isotype receiving BiovaxID manufactured with an IgM isotype, median time to relapse after randomization was 52.9 months versus 28.7 months in the IgM tumor isotype control-treated patients (log-rank p=0.001; HR=0.34 (p=0.002); [95% CI: 0.17-0.68]. Among 40 patients with IgG tumor isotype receiving BiovaxiD manufactured with an IgG isotype, median time to relapse after randomization was 35.1 months, versus 32.4 months in control-treated patients with IgG tumor isotype (log-rank p=0.807; HR=1.1 (p=0.807): [95% CI: 0.50-2.44].

In its multi-center, randomized, controlled Phase 3 clinical study, BiovaxID demonstrated that it can induce powerful anti-tumor immune responses while providing a median disease-free survival benefit of over 15 months, and a reduction of 42% in the risk of relapse, and in the company's Phase 2 clinical trial, 28% of patients who received BiovaxID remain in continuous remission at a median of 12.7 years of follow-up.

The approval of Dendreon's Provenge on April 29, 2010, indicates the FDA's willingness to accept a new class of drugs called cancer vaccines, of which BiovaxID is one. BiovaxID has also completed phase II trials for Mantle Cell Lymphoma and is being investigated for the treatment of other Non-Hodgkin's Lymphomas as well. On November 2, 2011, BiovaxID was granted seven years of U.S. market exclusivity for Waldenstrom's Macroglobulinemia, a third and rare type of Non-Hodgkin's Lymphoma.

== Regulatory status ==
In December 2013, Biovest reported that the European Medicines Agency (EMA) accepted the Company's Marketing Authorization Application (MAA) for BiovaxID (submitted to EMA as “Dasiprotimut-T Biovest”), a personalized cancer vaccine for the treatment of non-Hodgkin's follicular lymphoma. The MAA validation confirms the submission is complete and begins the formal EMA review process intended to secure approval to market BiovaxID in the European Union and to allow prescription and sale of BiovaxID for the treatment of non-Hodgkin's follicular lymphoma in patients who have achieved a first complete remission.

Biovest submitted its MAA following the successful completion and long-term follow-up of two Phase 2 clinical trials and of one multi-center, randomized, Phase 3 clinical trial (all conducted in partnership with the U.S. National Cancer Institute) in which BiovaxID demonstrated it could induce powerful anti-tumor immune responses, eradicate residual tumor cells from patients’ blood following chemotherapy, and improve the duration of complete remissions by a median of 15.4 months relative to control.

== Patents ==
Biovest has been granted many patents, including the following: Perfusion Bioreactors, Cell Culture Systems, and Methods for Production of Cells and Cell-Derived Products, Method and System for the Production of Cells and Cell Products and Applications Thereof, and Extra-Capillary Fluid Cycling System and Method for a Cell Culture Device.

== See also ==
- Dendreon
- Cancer vaccine
- Avax Technologies
