= Cancer vaccine =

Vaccine that either treats existing cancer or prevents development of cancer

A cancer vaccine, or oncovaccine, is a vaccine that either treats existing cancer or prevents development of cancer. Vaccines that treat existing cancer are known as therapeutic cancer vaccines or tumor antigen vaccines. Some of the vaccines are "autologous", being prepared from samples taken from the patient, and are specific to that patient.

The immune system normally destroys cancer cells in a process called immunosurveillance. However, cancers can adapt to evade the immune system. Tumors form when the immune system fails to destroy cancer cells and they are able to multiply.

Some types of cancer, such as cervical cancer and liver cancer, are caused by viruses (oncoviruses). Traditional vaccines against those viruses, such as the HPV vaccine and the hepatitis B vaccine, prevent those types of cancer. Other cancers are to some extent caused by bacterial infections (e.g. stomach cancer and Helicobacter pylori). Traditional vaccines against cancer-causing bacteria (oncobacteria) are not further discussed in this article.

== Method ==
One approach to cancer vaccination is to separate proteins from cancer cells and immunize patients against those proteins as antigens, in the hope of stimulating the immune system to kill the cancer cells. Research on cancer vaccines is underway for treatment of breast, lung, colon, skin, kidney, prostate and other cancers.

Another approach is to generate an immune response in situ in the patient using oncolytic viruses. This approach was used in the drug talimogene laherparepvec, a variant of herpes simplex virus engineered to selectively replicate in tumor tissue and to express the immune stimulatory protein GM-CSF. This enhances the anti-tumor immune response to tumor antigens released following viral lysis, creating a patient-specific vaccine.

== Mechanism of action ==
Tumor antigen vaccines work the same way that viral vaccines work, by training the immune system to attack cells that contain the antigens in the vaccine. The difference is that the antigens for viral vaccines are derived from viruses or cells infected with virus, while the antigens for tumor antigen vaccines are derived from cancer cells. Since tumor antigens are antigens found in cancer cells but not normal cells, vaccinations containing tumor antigens should train the immune system to target cancer cells not healthy cells. Cancer-specific tumor antigens include peptides from proteins that are not typically found in normal cells but are activated in cancer cells or peptides containing cancer-specific mutations. Antigen-presenting cells (APCs) such as dendritic cells take up antigens from the vaccine, process them into epitopes, and present the epitopes to T-cells via major histocompatibility complex proteins. If T-cells recognize the epitope as foreign, the adaptive immune system is activated and target cells that express the antigens.

== Prevention vs. treatment ==
Viral vaccines typically work by preventing the spread of the virus. Similarly, cancer vaccines can be designed to target common antigens before cancer evolves if an individual has appropriate risk factors. Additional preventive applications include preventing the cancer from evolving further or undergoing metastasis and preventing relapse after remission. Therapeutic vaccines focus on killing existing tumors. While cancer vaccines have generally been demonstrated to be safe, their efficacy still needs improvement. One way to potentially improve vaccine therapy is by combining the vaccine with other types of immunotherapy aimed at stimulating the immune system. Since tumors often evolve mechanisms to suppress the immune system, immune checkpoint blockade has recently received a lot of attention as a potential treatment to be combined with vaccines. For therapeutic vaccines, combined therapies can be more aggressive, but greater care to ensure the safety of relatively healthy patients is needed for combinations involving preventive vaccines.

== Types ==
Cancer vaccines can be cell-based, protein- or peptide-based, gene-based (DNA/RNA) or live attenuated bacterial- or viral organisms.

Cell-based vaccines include tumor cells or tumor cell lysates. Tumor cells from the patient are predicted to contain the greatest spectrum of relevant antigens, but this approach is expensive and often requires too many tumor cells from the patient to be effective. Using a combination of established cancer cell lines that resemble the patient's tumor can overcome these barriers, but this approach has yet to be effective. Canvaxin, which incorporates three melanoma cell lines, failed phase III clinical trials. Another cell-based vaccine strategy involves autologous dendritic cells (dendritic cells derived from the patient) to which tumor antigens are added. In this strategy, the antigen-presenting dendritic cells directly stimulate T-cells rather than relying on processing of the antigens by native APCs after the vaccine is delivered. The best known dendritic cell vaccine is Sipuleucel-T (Provenge), which only improved survival by four months. The efficacy of dendritic cell vaccines may be limited due to difficulty in getting the cells to migrate to lymph nodes and interact with T-cells.

Peptide-based vaccines usually consist of cancer specific-epitopes and often require an adjuvant (for example, GM-CSF) to stimulate the immune system and enhance antigenicity. Examples of these epitopes include Her2 peptides, such as GP2 and NeuVax. However, this approach requires MHC profiling of the patient because of MHC restriction. The need for MHC profile selection can be overcome by using longer peptides ("synthetic long peptides") or purified protein, which are then processed into epitopes by APCs.

Gene-based vaccines are composed of the nucleic acid (DNA/RNA) encoding for the gene. The gene is then expressed in APCs and the resulting protein product is processed into epitopes. Delivery of the gene is particularly challenging for this type of vaccine. At least one drug candidate, mRNA-4157/V940, is investigating newly developed mRNA vaccines for use in this application.

Live attenuated, ampicillin-susceptible Listeria monocytogenes strains are part of CRS-207 vaccine.

== Clinical trials ==
The clinicaltrials.gov website lists over 1900 trials associated with the term "cancer vaccine". Of these, 186 are Phase 3 trials.

- In a Phase III trial of follicular lymphoma (a type of non-Hodgkin's lymphoma), investigators reported that the BiovaxID (on average) prolonged remission by 44.2 months, versus 30.6 months for the control.
- On April 14, 2009, Dendreon Corporation announced that their Phase III clinical trial of sipuleucel-T, a cancer vaccine designed to treat prostate cancer, had demonstrated an increase in survival. It received U.S. Food and Drug Administration (FDA) approval for use in the treatment of advanced prostate cancer patients on April 29, 2010.
- Interim results from a phase III trial of talimogene laherparepvec in melanoma showed a significant tumour response compared to administration of GM-CSF alone.
- A 2015 Trial Watch review of peptide-based vaccines summarized the results of more than 60 trials that were published in the 13 months preceding the article. These trials targeted hematological malignancies (cancers of the blood), melanoma (skin cancer), breast cancer, head and neck cancer, gastroesophageal cancer, lung cancer, pancreatic cancer, prostate cancer, ovarian cancer, and colorectal cancers. The antigens included peptides from HER2, telomerase (TERT), survivin (BIRC5), and Wilms' tumor 1 (WT1). Several trials also used "personalized" mixtures of 12-15 distinct peptides. That is, they contain a mixture of peptides from the patient's tumor that the patient exhibits an immune response against. The results of these studies indicate that these peptide vaccines have minimal side effects and suggest that they induce targeted immune responses in patients treated with the vaccines. The article also discusses 19 clinical trials that were initiated in the same time period. These trials are targeting solid tumors, glioma, glioblastoma, melanoma, and breast, cervical, ovarian, colorectal, and non-small lung cell cancers and include antigens from MUC1, IDO1 (Indoleamine 2,3-dioxygenase), CTAG1B, and two VEGF receptors, FLT1 and KDR. Notably, the IDO1 vaccine is being tested in patients with melanoma in combination with the immune checkpoint inhibitor ipilimumab and the BRAF (gene) inhibitor vemurafenib.

The following table, summarizing information from another recent review shows an example of the antigen used in the vaccine tested in Phase 1/2 clinical trials for each of 10 different cancers:

Cancer type	Antigen
Bladder cancer	NY-ESO-1
Breast cancer	HER2
Cervical cancer	HPV16 E7 (Papillomaviridae#E7)
Colorectal cancer	CEA (Carcinoembryonic antigen)
Leukemia	WT1
Melanoma	MART-1, gp100, and tyrosinase
Non small lung cell cancer (NSCLC)	URLC10, VEGFR1, and VEGFR2
Ovarian cancer	survivin
Pancreatic cancer	MUC1
Prostate cancer	MUC2

== Approved oncovaccines ==
Oncophage was approved in Russia in 2008 for kidney cancer. It is marketed by Antigenics Inc.

Sipuleucel-T, Provenge, was approved by the FDA in April 2010 for metastatic hormone-refractory prostate cancer. It is marketed by Dendreon Corp.

CimaVax-EGF was approved in Cuba in 2011. Similar to Oncophage, it is not yet approved for use in the United States, although it is already undergoing phase II trials to that end.

Bacillus Calmette-Guérin (BCG) was approved by the FDA in 1990 as a vaccine for early-stage bladder cancer. BCG can be administered intravesically (directly into the bladder) or as an adjuvant in other cancer vaccines.

== Abandoned research ==
CancerVax (Canvaxin), Genitope Corp (MyVax personalized immunotherapy), and FavId FavId (Favrille Inc) are examples of cancer vaccine projects that have been terminated, due to poor phase III and IV results.

== Desirable characteristics ==
Cancer vaccines seek to target a tumor-specific antigen as distinct from self-proteins. Selection of the appropriate adjuvant to activate antigen-presenting cells to stimulate immune responses, is required. Bacillus Calmette-Guérin, an aluminum-based salt, and a squalene-oil-water emulsion are approved for clinical use. An effective vaccine should also stimulate long term immune memory to prevent tumor recurrence. Some scientists claim both the innate and adaptive immune systems must be activated to achieve total tumor elimination.

== Antigen candidates ==
Tumor antigens have been divided into two categories: shared tumor antigens; and unique tumor antigens. Shared antigens are expressed by many tumors. Unique tumor antigens result from mutations induced through physical or chemical carcinogens; they are therefore expressed only by individual tumors.

In one approach, vaccines contain whole tumor cells, though these vaccines have been less effective in eliciting immune responses in spontaneous cancer models. Defined tumor antigens decrease the risk of autoimmunity, but because the immune response is directed to a single epitope, tumors can evade destruction through antigen loss variance. A process called "epitope spreading" or "provoked immunity" may mitigate this weakness, as sometimes an immune response to a single antigen can lead to immunity against other antigens on the same tumor.

For example, since Hsp70 plays an important role in the presentation of antigens of destroyed cells including cancer cells, this protein may be used as an effective adjuvant in the development of antitumor vaccines.

== Hypothesized problems ==
A vaccine against a particular virus is relatively easy to create. The virus is foreign to the body, and therefore expresses antigens that the immune system can recognize. Furthermore, viruses usually only provide a few viable variants. By contrast, developing vaccines for viruses that mutate constantly such as influenza or HIV has been problematic. A tumor can have many cell types of cells, each with different cell-surface antigens. Those cells are derived from each patient and display few if any antigens that are foreign to that individual. This makes it difficult for the immune system to distinguish cancer cells from normal cells. Some scientists believe that renal cancer and melanoma are the two cancers with most evidence of spontaneous and effective immune responses, possibly because they often display antigens that are evaluated as foreign. Many attempts at developing cancer vaccines are directed against these tumors. However, Provenge's success in prostate cancer, a disease that never spontaneously regresses, suggests that cancers other than melanoma and renal cancer may be equally amenable to immune attack.

However, most vaccine clinical trials have failed or had modest results according to the standard RECIST criteria. The precise reasons are unknown, but possible explanations include:

- Disease stage too advanced: bulky tumor deposits actively suppress the immune system using mechanisms such as secretion of cytokines that inhibit immune activity. The most suitable stage for a cancer vaccine is likely to be early, when the tumor volume is low, which complicates the trial process, which take upwards of five years and require many patients to reach measurable end points. One alternative is to target patients with residual disease after surgery, radiotherapy or chemotherapy that does not harm the immune system.
- Escape loss variants (that target a single tumor antigen) are likely to be less effective. Tumors are heterogeneous and antigen expression differs markedly between tumors (even in the same patient). The most effective vaccine is likely to raise an immune response against a broad range of tumor antigens to minimise the chance of the tumor mutating and becoming resistant to the therapy.
- Prior treatments may have modified tumors in ways that nullify the vaccine. (Numerous clinical trials treated patients following chemotherapy that may destroy the immune system. Patients who are immune suppressed are not good candidates for vaccines.)
- Some tumors progress rapidly and/or unpredictably, and they can outpace the immune system. Developing a mature immune response to a vaccine may require months, but some cancers (e.g. advanced pancreatic) can kill patients in less time.
- Many cancer vaccine clinical trials target patients' immune responses. Correlations typically show that the patients with the strongest immune responses lived the longest, offering evidence that the vaccine is working. An alternative explanation is that patients with the best immune responses were healthier patients with a better prognosis, and would have survived longest even without the vaccine.

== Recommendations ==
A January 2009 review article recommended steps for oncovaccine development:

- Target settings with a low disease burden.
- Conduct randomized Phase II trials so that the Phase III program is sufficiently powered.
- Do not randomize antigen plus adjuvant versus adjuvant alone. The goal is to establish clinical benefit of the immunotherapy (i.e., adjuvanted vaccine) over the standard of care. The adjuvant may have a low-level clinical effect that skews the trial, increasing the chances of a false negative.
- Base development decisions on clinical data rather than immune responses. Time-to-event end points are more valuable and clinically relevant.
- Design regulatory into the program from inception; invest in manufacturing and product assays early.

== See also ==
- Immunotherapy
- Cancer immunotherapy
  - Coley's toxins
- Chemoprophylaxis
- HPV vaccines
- Therapeutic vaccines
- Cancer vaccine targeting CD4+ T cells
- Personalized mRNA cancer vaccine therapy
- Ludwig Institute for Cancer Research
- Cancer Research Institute
