= Cancer vaccine targeting CD4+ T cells =

Type of vaccine used to treat existing cancer

Cancer vaccine targeting CD4^{+} T cells is a type of vaccine used to treat existing cancer. Cancerous cells usually cannot be recognized by the human immune system, and therefore cannot be destroyed. Some researchers state that cancer can be treated by increasing the response of T cells, especially CD4^{+} T cells, to cancerous cells through cancer vaccine injection.

== Mechanism ==
CD4^{+} T cells promote anti-tumor immunity through numerous mechanisms, including enhancing antigen presentation, co-stimulation, T cell homing, T cell activation, and effector function. These effects are mediated at sites of T cell priming and at the tumor microenvironment. Several cancer vaccine approaches induce durable CD4^{+} T cell responses and have promising clinical activity. This kind of vaccine can be realized by DNA recombinant fusion proteins expressed in E. coli. The protein MAGE-3 has already been used in lung cancer treatment and has received positive feedback.

== Advantages ==
Recent studies show the crucial role of proliferating activated effector memory T_{h}1 CD4^{+} T cells in effective anti-tumor immunity and reveal that CD4^{+} T cells induce more durable immune-mediated tumor control than CD8^{+} T cells. Even though CD4^{+} T cells are known to play a central role in regulating virtually all antigen-specific immune responses, their role in immune responses to tumor antigens has not been widely studied compared to that of CD8^{+} T cells. This is due to the fact that most tumors are positive for MHC class I but negative for MHC class II, and CD8^{+} cytotoxic T lymphocytes (CTLs) are able to induce tumor killing upon direct recognition of peptide antigens presented by the tumor's MHC class I molecules.

This preference has been bolstered by numerous adoptive transfer studies in which CD8^{+} T cell lines and CD8^{+} clones specific for tumor antigens (that have been stimulated in vitro) can mediate anti-tumor immunity when transferred back into tumor-bearing hosts; furthermore, recent reports suggest that immunization (using either adjuvant or dendritic cells with pure tumor peptides) can result in productive anti-tumor immunity that is restricted by MHC class I.

Finally, elimination of CD8^{+} T cells from mice at least partially abrogates anti-tumor immunity induced by most cancer vaccines. Similarly, a critical role for CD4^{+} T cells in induced anti-tumor immunity has been consistently demonstrated in vaccine/challenge experiments employing antibody-mediated depletion of CD4^{+} T cells or using CD4-knockout mice. Abrogation of anti-tumor immunity in CD4-knockout mice or mice depleted of CD4^{+} T cells has been demonstrated in cases of cell-based vaccines, recombinant viral vaccines and recombinant bacterial vaccines. While most adoptive transfer experiments have been performed with tumor-specific CD8^{+} T cells, activated CD4^{+} T cell clones specific for the murine leukemia virus have been demonstrated to confer systemic anti-tumor immunity upon transfer into tumor-bearing hosts.

== Experiments ==
CD4^{+} T cells has already been successfully induced in non-small-cell lung carcinoma patients vaccinated with MAGE-3 recombinant protein. Two cohorts were analyzed: one receiving MAGE-3 protein alone, and one receiving MAGE-3 protein with adjuvant AS028. Of nine patients in the first cohort, three developed marginal antibody titers and another one had a CD8^{+} T cell response to HLA-A2-restricted peptide MAGE-3 271–279.

In contrast, of eight patients from the second cohort vaccinated with MAGE-3 protein and adjuvant, seven developed high-titered antibodies to MAGE-3, and four had a strong concomitant CD4^{+} T cell response to HLA-DP4-restricted peptide 243–258. One patient simultaneously developed CD8^{+} T cells to HLA-A1-restricted peptide 168–176. The novel monitoring methodology used in this MAGE-3 study established that protein vaccination induces clear CD4^{+} T cell responses for further evaluating integrated immune responses in vaccine settings and for optimizing these responses for clinical benefit.

Studies have indicated that CD4^{+} T cells in vivo have the capacity to enhance CD8^{+} T cell activity and, most importantly, help to maintain the immune response for sustained periods of time. Therefore, it seems likely that optimal anti-tumor activity can only be achieved if both CD4^{+} and CD8^{+} tumor-specific T cells are induced. The inclusion of CD4^{+} epitopes into MAGE-3 vaccination studies has recently been facilitated by the identification of several HLA-DR-restricted and one HLA-DP4-restricted epitope.

== Clinical trials ==
Clinical vaccination studies using full-length recombinant proteins have the advantage that this form of antigen potentially includes the full range of epitopes for CD4^{+} and CD8^{+} T T cells. In addition, it is likely that protein vaccination leads to presentation of epitopes in the context of various HLA alleles, and therefore this type of vaccine should be applicable to any patient regardless of HLA restriction.

To date, only one clinical study using MAGE-3 protein as a vaccine has been reported. Using a cloning approach, one patient was shown to have a CD4^{+} T cell response to HLA-DR1-restricted peptide 267–282.

== Future work ==
At this point, not enough data has been collected from human trials. As a result, the side effects or the long-term results are still unknown. In addition, future work should further optimize vaccine adjuvants and combination therapies incorporating helper peptide vaccines.

== See also ==
List of distinct cell types in the adult human body
