= Therapeutic vaccines =

Vaccination received after infection

A therapeutic vaccine is a vaccine which is administered after a disease or infection has already occurred. A therapeutic vaccine works by activating the immune system of a patient to fight an infection. A therapeutic vaccine differs from a prophylactic vaccine in that prophylactic vaccines are administered to individuals as a precautionary measure to avoid the infection or disease while therapeutic vaccines are administered after the individual is already affected by the disease or infection. A therapeutic vaccine fights an existing infection in the body rather than immunizing the body for protection against future diseases and infections. Therapeutic vaccines are mostly used against viral infections. Patients affected with chronic viral infections are administered with therapeutic vaccines, as their immune system is not able to produce enough efficient antibodies.

Provenge, developed by Dendreon, was the first therapeutic vaccine approved by the FDA in 2010. This therapeutic vaccine helped in treating prostate cancer where patients' own white blood cells (WBCs) were taken and treated with drug (vaccine) to train them to differentiate and fight cancer cells.

== Functionality ==
Therapeutic vaccines are a new form of vaccines that are mostly being used for viral infections and various types of cancers. A therapeutic vaccine helps an immune system to recognise a foreign agent such as cancerous cells or a virus. The specific type of therapeutic vaccines include antigen vaccines. In case of antigen vaccines, the body is introduced to a foreign agent to activate the immune system so that it recognizes the agent when later encountered.

== Types ==
There are two types of therapeutic vaccines:

=== Autologous vaccines ===
Autologous means 'derived from oneself' – an autologous vaccine is a personalized vaccine which is made from an individual's own cells which could be either cancer cells or immune system cells.

=== Allogeneic vaccines ===
Allo means 'other'. Allogeneic vaccines are primarily cancer vaccines which are made from a different individual's cancer cells which are grown in a lab.

== How therapeutic vaccines differ from prophylactic vaccines ==
Therapeutic vaccines are a method of treatment, not prevention. Like any other vaccine, the immune system is regulated against a specific type of target. The main goal is to enhance the immune system activity. This type of vaccine can be employed for the treatment of various type of diseases and viral infections. Efforts are being made to develop vaccines against various fatal diseases such as HIV, cancer, dengue fever, cholera, Diphtheria, etc.

== Therapeutic vaccines against HIV ==
HIV has no vaccine up until now, but therapeutic vaccines could be a breakthrough for HIV. Such vaccines would enhance affected patients' immune systems to fight the disease. People affected with HIV can suppress HIV to an undetectable level with the use of antiretroviral therapy (ART). However, ART cannot cure HIV infection, and therapeutic vaccines may enhance immune functions to potentially cure HIV. If therapeutic vaccines for HIV work out, many lives will be saved. Many clinical trials are being conducted for HIV therapeutic vaccines, such as those conducted by AIDSinfo, summaries for their trials are available at their website.

== Therapeutic vaccine against cancers ==
Cancer types and stages have enhanced with time and so has efforts to treat cancer. In 2017 there were about 369 cancer vaccine studies ongoing all around the world.

There are three cancer therapeutic vaccines which are approved by USA Food and Drug Administration:

Provenge is Sipuleucel-T, a dendritic cell based vaccine for prostate cancer. Bacillus Calmettle-Guerin (TheraCys) is a live attenuated vaccine which makes use of Mycobacterium bovis strain for bladder invasive cancer. Talimogene laherparepvec (T-VEC or Imlygic) is a vaccine for advanced oncolytic melanoma
