= Avax =

Avax may refer to:

- Avax Group, a Greek construction company formerly known as J&P-Avax
- Avax Technologies, an American bio-tech company
- AVAX, the native token of Avalanche blockchain
