= Personalized mRNA cancer vaccine therapy =

Therapy that uses a personalized cancer vaccine based on mRNA vaccine technology

Personalized mRNA cancer vaccine therapy is a therapy that uses a personalized cancer vaccine based on mRNA vaccine technology to target existing tumors in patients. As of 2024, a number of mRNA cancer vaccines are in clinical trials, of which many are personalized therapies based on engineering mRNA-mediated immune response that targets the patient's particular strain of cancer cells.

Experimental treatments include treatments for pancreatic cancer, head and neck cancers, and melanoma.

In 2024, the British National Health Service announced that had launched its Cancer Vaccine Launch Pad, a collaboration for trials for the use of personalized mRNA cancer vaccines on its patients.
