= Avax Technologies =

American biotechnology company

Avax Technologies, Inc.
- Type: Public
- Traded as: Expert Market: AVXT
- Industry: Biomedicine
- Headquarters: Philadelphia, Pennsylvania, United States
- Key people: Richard Rainey (chairman and CEO)
- Products: AC Vaccine
- Services: Cancer vaccines
- Subsidiaries: Genopoietic SA

Avax Technologies, Inc. is a Philadelphia-based biotechnology company whose most advanced product candidate is MVax for melanoma. MVax is a cancer vaccine that received a Special Protocol Assessment agreement with the FDA in October 2006, and subsequently began a Phase III registration clinical trial in November 2007. In previous studies, MVax demonstrated a 5-year overall survival rate (OS)of 44% and response rate of 35% (13% CR, 22% PR).

== AC Vaccine ==
=== Product candidates ===
==== MVax ====
Started - May 2007. It reached phase III trial for Stage IV Melanoma, but did not lead to FDA approval and is no longer active due to critical financial limitations faced by its manufacturer.

MVax’s Phase II response rate of 35% (CR + PR) in combination with low-dose IL-2 compares favorably to the Phase II results of other melanoma cancer vaccines such as Vical’s Allovectin-7 (11% CR + PR) and BioVex’s OncoVex (28% CR + PR), both of which are given as stand alone therapy.

Due to the 2008 financial crisis and cancer vaccine failures by companies such as Favrille and Cell Genesys, Avax had trouble attracting investors. In an effort to conserve cash, enrollment for the Phase III trial was suspended on March 26, 2009, but the trial itself is still ongoing. However on December 16, 2009, the company obtained bridge financing in the amount of $1,400,000. This will be used to conduct an interim analysis of the Phase III data for MVax. CEO John Prendergast notes: "Recent and anticipated news by companies involved with cancer vaccines and immunotherapies has resulted in renewed interest in the sector by institutional investors, larger pharma, biotechnology companies and the medical and scientific communities at large.".

==== OVax ====
Started - April 2008, a Phase I/II trial for ovarian cancer. Encouraging results reported Feb 2016. Median survival was 22.7 months with no treatment-related serious adverse events.

== Genopoietic SA ==
Based in Lyon, France, has a GMP facility that manufactures the vaccines for Avax. The facility is certified by the French government for commercial and clinical vaccine production for the European markets.

== See also ==
- Dendreon
- Cancer vaccine
