= Obesity and cancer =

Association between obesity and risk of cancer

The association between obesity, as defined by a body mass index of 30 or higher, and risk of a variety of types of cancer has received a considerable amount of attention in recent years. Obesity has been associated with an increased risk of esophageal cancer, pancreatic cancer, colorectal cancer, breast cancer (among postmenopausal women), endometrial cancer, kidney cancer, thyroid cancer, liver cancer and gallbladder cancer. Obesity may also lead to increased cancer-related mortality. Obesity has also been described as the fat tissue disease version of cancer, where common features between the two diseases were suggested for the first time.

== Importance of obesity in causing cancer ==
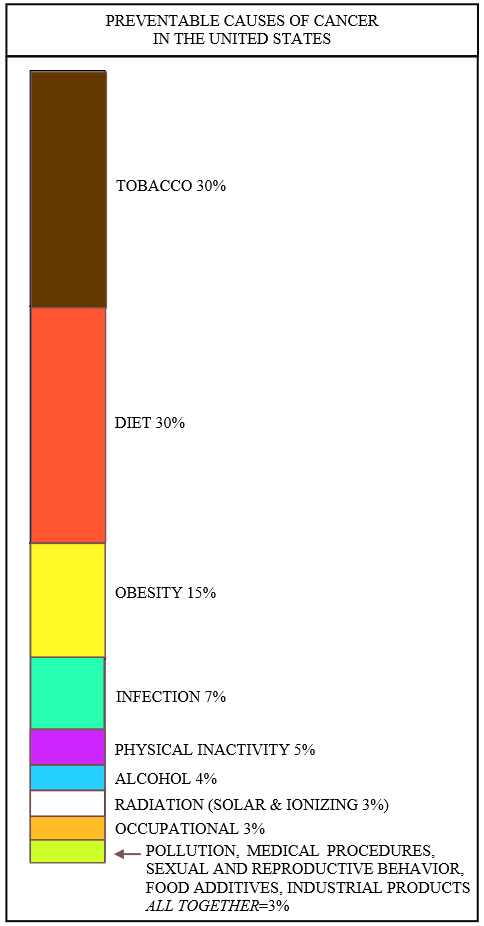
The approximate relative levels of the preventable causes of cancer in the United States, taken from the article Cancer prevention

About 75-80% of all cancers in the United States are preventable, if risk factors are avoided (also see (Cancer prevention). Obesity appears to be the third most important risk factor for cancer in the United States, just behind tobacco and diet (see Figure). Obesity is the source of about 15% of all preventable cancers.

In 2018, Chinese researchers performed a systematic review and comprehensive quantitative meta‐analysis of cohort studies reporting body mass index (BMI) and the risk of 23 cancer types, providing epidemiological evidence supporting the association between BMI and cancer risk. The strongest positive association between BMI and cancer risk was found among patients in North America.

== Mechanisms ==
The mechanisms by which obesity may increase the risk of cancer are not well understood, but it is believed that the combined effects of the adipose tissue environment and the endocrine alterations that accompany it among obese people both interact to promote tumor initiation and progression. Adipose tissue also creates an inflammatory environment that enhances the ability of tumor cells to metastatize.

The U.S. National Cancer Institute indicates that one of the main ways in which obesity can cause cancer is by promoting chronic low-level inflammation, which can, over time, cause DNA damage that leads to cancer. Articles supporting this view were reviewed by Cerda et al. There are also a number of hormonal, metabolic and other changes caused by obesity that may affect carcinogenesis. A review by Tahergorabi et al. summarizes articles indicating that obesity induces changes in angiogenesis, inflammation, interaction of proinflammatory cytokines, endocrine hormones, adipokines including leptin and adiponectin, insulin, growth factors, estrogen, progesterone and cell metabolism.

DNA damage appears to be the primary cause of cancer (see Carcinogenesis). It is not clear which factor(s) altered by obesity are major source(s) of the DNA damages causing increased cancer risk in obese individuals. However, both reduced DNA repair and increased DNA damage are observed in obese individuals.

=== Reduced DNA repair ===
As first noted in 2005, there is evidence that overweight/obesity is associated with reduced DNA repair capacity. This was shown, in particular, in women with breast cancer.

Lymphocytes from postmenopausal obese women also have reduced DNA repair capacity compared to non-obese postmenopausal women.

If DNA repair is reduced by obesity, this would allow DNA damages to accumulate. Excess DNA damages, when present in replicating cells, can cause an increase in oncogenic mutations through error-prone translesion synthesis during replication.

=== Increased DNA damage ===
An 8-fold and 5.6-fold increase in nuclear damage was observed in lymphocytes of obese and overweight children respectively, compared to children of normal weight, evaluated by the gamma-H2AX focus assay. The gamma-H2AX assay generally reflects the presence of double-strand breaks in DNA, though the assay may indicate other DNA damages as well. Similarly, there was a 2.7-fold and 2.5-fold increase in micronuclei in lymphocytes of obese and overweight children respectively, compared to children of normal weight. Micronuclei are usually a sign of genotoxic events and chromosomal instability (see Micronucleus).

8-dihydro-2'-deoxyguanosine (8-oxodG) concentration in peripheral blood lymphocytes is an index of nuclear DNA damage. 8-oxodG damages are mutagenic. The level of 8-oxodG was measured in 58 overweight and obese adult patients as well as in 20 normal weight individuals. The level of 8-oxodG correlated positively with body mass, BMI, hip circumference and triglyceride concentration.

In a study by Donmez-Altuntas et al., 83 obese, 21 over-weight and 21 normal-weight subjects were tested. Frequencies of DNA damages as measured by frequencies of micronuclei, nucleoplasmic bridges and nuclear buds were found to be significantly higher in lymphocytes of obese subjects than in normal-weight and over-weight subjects (p<0.01 and p<0.05) respectively.

Hofer et al., used the enzyme formamidopyrimidine DNA glycosylase (FPG) and gel electrophoresis to measure levels of DNA damage (oxidized purines). They found two factors that can affect DNA damage in a young healthy population. These were fruit intake (high intake; lower DNA damage) and BMI (high BMI; higher DNA damage).

In the study by Tafurt-Cardona et al., described above, where they found reduced DNA repair in obese postmenopausal women, they also found increased DNA damages, as measured by frequencies of chromosome aberrations, in the obese postmenopausal women.

== Association by cancer site ==
=== Bladder cancer ===
Obesity is associated with an increased risk of bladder cancer.

=== Breast cancer ===
Obesity has been found to decrease the risk of breast cancer among African and Caucasian women, but increase it among Asian women. Obesity is also associated with decreased survival among women with breast cancer, regardless of whether the cancer is pre- or post-menopausal.

=== Colorectal cancer ===
Both general and central obesity are associated with an increased risk of colorectal cancer (CRC). The relative risk among obese people relative to those of normal weight has been reported to be 1.334. An association between increased BMI and risk of colorectal adenoma has been reported, as has a dose–response relationship between BMI and colorectal adenoma risk. Increased BMI also increases all-cause mortality and mortality from CRC specifically among people diagnosed with CRC.

=== Lung cancer ===
Obesity has been found to protect against lung cancer, especially among those who smoke or have smoked cigarettes.

=== Liver cancer ===
Obesity affects the liver through non-alcoholic fatty liver disease which can cause steatohepatitis which in turn, due to the inflammation caused by the hepatitis, can cause oncogenic changes in hepatocytes. Dietary or genetic obesity induces alterations of the gut microbiota that result in an increased level of deoxycholic acid, a gut bacterial metabolite considered to cause DNA damage leading to liver cancer.

=== Renal cell cancer ===
Obesity is a risk factor for renal cell cancer.

=== Thyroid cancer ===
Obese people are at a higher risk of thyroid cancer than are their normal weight counterparts.
