= Samuel Strober =

American physician

- Died: February 11, 2022
- Education: Columbia College; Harvard Medical School
- Occupation: Physician
- Spouse: Myra Strober (divorced)
- Medical career
- Institutions: Stanford Medical School

Samuel Strober (May 8, 1940-February 11, 2022 (aged 81)) was a biomedical researcher and inventor best known for his work on the elimination of the need for lifelong immune suppressive drugs in organ transplant patients.

Strober was born in Brooklyn, New York, on May 8, 1940, and received his bachelor's degree from Columbia College in 1961, and his MD from the Harvard Medical School in 1966. He also studied at Massachusetts General and Stanford University Hospitals and the Sir William Dunn School of Pathology at Oxford University.

He was chief of the Division of Immunology and Rheumatology at the Stanford University School of Medicine (1979–1997); a co-founder of a biotechnology company, Dendreon, that developed the first FDA approved cancer vaccination; President of the Clinical Immunology Society (1996); and chairman of the Board of Directors of the La Jolla Institute for Allergy and Immunology. He also co-founded Medeor Therapeutics.

== Personal life ==
His first wife is feminist economist Myra Strober, who decided to keep the Strober last name after she remarried.
