= Myra Strober =

American economist (born c. 1940)

- Born: Myra H. Strober c. 1940
- Spouses: Jay Jackman (deceased), * Samuel Strober (divorced; deceased)

Academic background
- Education: Cornell University

Academic work
- Discipline: Economics
- Institutions: Stanford Graduate School of Education, Stanford Graduate School of Business

Myra H. Strober (born c. 1940) is professor of education, emerita, for the school of education, at Stanford Graduate School of Business, Stanford, California, US. She also sits on the editorial board of Feminist Economics, and was the president of the International Association for Feminist Economics (IAFFE) from 1997 to 1999.

== Education ==
Myra Strober received her degree from Cornell University School of Industrial and Labor Relations in 1962. In 1965, she gained a masters in economics from Tufts University. Her economics doctorate came from MIT in 1969.

== Personal life ==
Strober was married to fellow Stanford University School of Medicine professor Samuel Strober, and the two had two children. She then married psychiatrist Jay M. Jackman until his death in January 2022.

== Selected bibliography ==
=== Books ===
- Strober, Myra H; Gordon, Francine E (1975). Bringing women into management. New York: McGraw-Hill. ISBN 978-0-07-023806-0.
- Strober, Myra H; Dornbusch, Sanford M (1988). Feminism, children, and the new families. New York: Guilford Press. ISBN 978-0-89862-514-1.
- Strober, Myra H; Davisson, Abby (2023). Money and Love An Intelligent Roadmap for Life's Biggest Decisions. San Francisco, California: HarperOne. ISBN 978-0-06-311751-8.
- Strober, Myra H; Chan, Agnes M K (1999). The road winds uphill all the way gender, work, and family in the United States and Japan. Cambridge, Massachusetts: MIT Press. ISBN 978-0-262-19415-0.
- Strober, Myra H (2016). Sharing the Work: What My Family and Career Taught Me about Breaking Through (and Holding the Door Open for Others). Cambridge, Massachusetts: MIT Press. ISBN 978-0-262-53355-3.
- Strober, Myra H (2011). Interdisciplinary conversations challenging habits of thought. Stanford, California: Stanford University Press. ISBN 978-0-8047-7231-0.

=== Journal articles and chapters in books ===
- Strober, Myra H.; Jackman, Jay M (April 2003). "Fear of feedback". Harvard Business Review. 81 (4): 101–7, 124. PMID 12687924.
- Strober, Myra H.; Chan, Agnes (1998). "Husbands, wives, and housework: graduates of Stanford and Tokyo Universities". Feminist Economics. 4 (3): 97–127. doi:10.1080/135457098338329.
- Strober, Myra H. (2002), "What's a wife worth?", in Yalom, Marilyn; Freedman, Estelle; Carstensen, Laura; et al. (eds.), Inside the American couple: new thinking, new challenges, Berkeley: University of California Press, pp. 174–188, ISBN 978-0-520-22957-0
- Strober, Myra H. (1998). "Introduction: this one's for you, Barbara". Feminist Economics. 4 (3): 1. doi:10.1080/135457098338266. - Tribute edition for Barbara Bergmann.
- Strober, Myra H; Cook, Allen; Fuller, Kasi Allen (1997). "Making and correcting errors in student economic analyses: an examination of videotapes". The Journal of Economic Education. 28 (3): 255–271. doi:10.1080/00220489709596748.
- Strober, Myra H; Cook, Allen; Fuller, Kasi Allen (1997). "Making and correcting errors in student economic analyses: an examination of videotapes". The Journal of Economic Education. 28 (3): 255–271. doi:10.1080/00220489709596748.

== See also ==
- Feminist economics
- List of feminist economists

Non-profit organisation positions
Preceded by Marianne Ferber	President of the International Association for Feminist Economics; 1997–1999	Succeeded by Barbara Bergmann
