= CancerVax =

American biotechnology company

- Industry: Pharmaceutical
- Founded: 2021
- Headquarters: Lehi, Utah, USA
- Area served: North America
- Products: Cancer therapeutics
- Website: cancervax.com

CancerVax, Inc. is an American biotechnology company based in Lehi, Utah.

Founded in 2021, CancerVax is developing a novel Universal Cancer Treatment Platform that will be customizable as injections to treat many types of cancer.

CancerVax's approach detects, marks, and kills only cancer cells. By making cancer cells appear as well-immunized common diseases such as measles or chickenpox, they intend to use the body's natural immune system to kill the cancer cells easily.

The CancerVax technology is designed to make cancer cells look like common diseases that the immune system already recognizes, such as measles, and "trick" the body into killing these "disguised" cancer cells with strength.

CancerVax previously collaborated with the University of California, Los Angeles (UCLA) on a cancer research project to develop an immunotherapy for Ewing Sarcoma. CancerVax is a privately-held company.
