= Oncophage =

Oncophage (brand name Vitespen), also known as cancer vaccine heat shock protein peptide complex-96 and cancer vaccine HSPPC-96, is a personalized cancer vaccine developed by the American biopharmaceutical company Antigenics Inc. (now Agenus) that is evaluated in multiple clinical trials. It has been granted fast track and orphan drug designations from the US Food and Drug Administration for kidney cancer, metastatic melanoma, and glioma.

The investigational agent is not yet approved in the US but was approved in Russia in April 2008 for patients who have earlier-stage kidney cancer. The European Medicines Agency is evaluating conditional approval for Oncophage.

Oncophage is one of a group of new drugs called cancer vaccines that intend to train the body's immune system to fight the cancer. While chemotherapy is often accompanied by severe side effects, cancer vaccines tend to have only minimal ones (often only inflammations of the injection site).

In April 2009, the World Vaccine Congress named Oncophage as the best therapeutic vaccine.

However, after a negative opinion from the Committee for Medicinal Products for Human Use (CHMP) on 19 November 2009, Antigenics Inc. decided to withdraw their application for approval by the European Medicines Agency shortly after on 23 November 2009.

== Description ==
Oncophage (Vitespen) is a vaccine made from a patient's tumor by extracting heat shock protein gp96 and its associated peptides.

== Clinical trials ==
One trial is evaluating the investigational agent alone in patients with first recurrence of glioma while the second trial is evaluating Oncophage (Vitespen) in combination with Temozolomide, a common chemotherapy, in patients that are newly diagnosed with brain cancer.

A first phase I clinical trial in glioma extended median survival of the group of patients, which was diagnosed with multiple recurrencies of glioma, to over 10 months.
