= Cell-based vaccine =

Cell-based vaccines are developed from mammalian or more rarely avian or insect cell lines rather than the more common method which uses the cells in embryonic chicken eggs to develop the antigens. The potential use of cell culture techniques in developing viral vaccines has been widely investigated in the 2000s as a complementary and alternative platform to the current egg-based strategies.

Vaccines work to prepare an immune system to fight off disease by generating an immune response to disease-causing agents. This immune response enables the immune system to act more quickly and effectively when exposed to that antigen again, and is the most effective tool to date to prevent the spread of infectious diseases.

== Production ==
To produce viral vaccines, candidate vaccine viruses are grown in mammalian, avian or insect tissue culture of cells with a finite lifespan. These cells are typically Madin-Darby Canine Kidney cells, but others are also used including monkey cell lines pMK and Vero and human cell lines HEK 293, MRC 5, Per.C6, PMK, and WI-38. The candidate vaccine virus strain will replicate using the mammalian cells. Next, the virus is extracted from the cells in the liquid culture, purified, then tested or modified for the specific vaccine being produced. Next, the selected virus is inoculated into cultured cells and the virus allowed to replicate for some time. Then, the virus-containing fluid is collected from the cells and the virus antigen is purified, the viruses inactivated, and the product tested.

== Advantages ==
The main benefit of cell-based vaccines is the ability to rapidly produce vaccine supplies during an impending pandemic. Cell-based antigen production offer a faster and more stable production of vaccines compared to embryonic chicken eggs, which produce 1-2 vaccine doses per chicken egg. Though host cells replicate well in chicken eggs, vaccine production with mammalian cells would not rely on an adequate supply of chicken eggs to produce each vaccine. In addition, cell-based vaccines may allow for multiple viral vaccines be produced in the same production platforms and facilities in a more sterile environment. In addition, some strains do not grow well on embryonic chicken eggs.

Cell lines grown in synthetic media avoid animal serum, which may pose a sterility problem, more specifically, preventing the spread of transmissible spongiform encephalopathies. Another benefit is the avoidance of egg-allergen. Lastly, cell-based vaccines may be more effective given that, with egg-based vaccines, there is a risk that the virus may mutate (antigenic drift) during its long growth phase in the chicken egg, thus causing the immune system to produce a different antibody than originally intended.

== Approved examples ==
=== Influenza ===
==== Flublok ====
In 2013, FluBlok, which is produced with insect cells, was approved by the United States Food and Drug Administration, for use in the United States. Developed by Protein Sciences Corporation, it is suitable for people with egg allergies.

==== Flucelvax ====
In 2012, the US FDA approved Flucelvax as the first mammalian cell-based Influenza vaccine in the United States. The vaccine was produced by Novartis through culturing of the Madin-Darby canine kidney cell line. Specifically, Flucelvax targets four Influenza sub-types which includes Influenza A subtype H1N1, Influenza A subtype H3N2, and two Influenza B viruses. The vaccine is approved for people over the age of three years. As of 2013, Flucelvax had shown similar levels of vaccine efficacy and immunogenicity as traditional egg-based vaccines.

==== Optaflu ====
Optaflu, produced by Novartis, was approved by the European Medicines Agency in 2009, for use in countries affiliated with the European Union. Optaflu is nearly identical to Flucelvax; it is also produced in Madin-Darby canine kidney cells and targets the same Influenza subtypes. The main differences are in release specifications for measuring vaccine lots' safety, efficacy, and quality, mostly due to differences between U.S. and European regulatory standards and tests.

=== Rotavirus ===
The Food and Drug Administration approved two mammalian vero cell based vaccines for rotavirus, Rotarix by GlaxoSmithKline and RotaTeq by Merck.

=== Measles ===
Attenuvax is a vaccine approved in 2007, against measles developed using a primary cell line.

=== Smallpox ===
ACAM2000 is a smallpox vaccine approved by the Food and Drug Administration in 2007.

=== Polio ===
IPOL, developed by Sanofi Pasteur, was approved by the Food and Drug Administration in 1987.

=== Rabies ===
Verorab, developed by Sanofi Pasteur, is a mammalian vero cell based rabies vaccine approved by the World Health Organization.

=== Others ===
Ixiaro by Valneva SE for Japanese encephalitis.
