= Dendreon =

Biotechnology company

Coordinates: 47.607948°N 122.338547°W

Dendreon Pharmaceuticals LLC
- Type: Private
- Traded as: Nasdaq: DNDN
- Industry: Biomedicine
- Founder: William A. Haseltine; Edgar Engleman; Samuel Strober
- Headquarters: Seal Beach, California, U.S.
- Products: Provenge
- Services: Provenge
- Number of employees: 650
- Parent: Sanpower Group, Nanjing, CN
- Website: dendreon.com

Dendreon Pharmaceuticals LLC is a biotechnology company. Its lead product, Provenge (known generically as sipuleucel-T), is an immunotherapy for prostate cancer. It consists of a mixture of the patient's own blood cells (autologous, with dendritic cells thought to be the most important) that have been incubated with the Dendreon PAP-GM-CSF fusion protein. Phase III clinical trial results demonstrating a survival benefit for prostate cancer patients receiving the drug were presented at the AUA meeting on April 28, 2009. After going through the approval process, Provenge was given full approval by the FDA on April 29, 2010. Dendreon's stock value fell 66% on August 4, 2011, after abandoning its forecast for its debut drug Provenge.

In November 2014, Dendreon filed for Chapter 11 bankruptcy protection and shortly afterwards announced that it had reached agreements on the terms of a financial restructuring with certain bond holders.

On February 20, 2015, Valeant Pharmaceuticals received approval to purchase all Dendreon assets. On January 9, 2017, Chinese conglomerate Sanpower Group agreed to acquire Dendreon from Valeant for $820 million, with the transaction successfully closing in June 2017.

== Technology overview and pipeline ==
=== Antigen delivery cassette and antigen presenting cells ===
Dendreon's name derives from the "Dendritic Cell" which forms a major component of the company's product candidates that use the "Dendreon Cassette Technology" to insert a disease-specific target protein into a general platform. Their lead product, Provenge, is an example of their "rationally designed therapeutic process" intended to break immune tolerance to certain disease specific proteins. It is hypothesized that receptor mediated uptake of antigen by dendritic cells occurs when they are exposed to the Dendreon fusion protein which links the disease specific protein to a recognition protein. This approach is in contrast to other dendritic cell vaccines that use methods such as electroporation to get the DC's to present antigen related epitopes. In the case of Provenge, this disease related protein is prostatic acid phosphatase and the signalling component is GM-CSF.

=== Antigen selection ===
Dendreon believes its process can be optimized and generalized to other diseases by exchanging the PAP component of Provenge with better targets specific to different diseased cells. Antigen selection is a significant issue with cancer vaccines in general. Presumably, therapeutic effect can be obtained by provoking a selective response against the diseased cells only. Dendreon has explored approaches to obtaining tumour-specific antigen targets under the theory that the immune system may be able to mount a more effective response than is otherwise possible against tumor associated antigens. Unaltered human PAP is expressed by normal prostate cells but recent discoveries suggest that cancer cells produce many more unique targets as well as proteins that are more highly expressed than in normal tissue. It has also been recently discovered that other enzymes expressed in nerves are identical to PAP and there is ongoing work to examine post-translational modifications to PAP and its correlation to disease state by Dendreon collaborators. PAP also appears to be expressed in breast cysts.

Prior work in this area has also included that of A. Sette at Epimmune and the Altered Peptide Ligand approach typified by Neurocrine Biotech's failed MS drug.

=== Nuvelo and patents acquired from Corvas ===
Dendreon acquired the nematode anticoagulant Nuvelo. Selected Corvas patents include technologies for peptide analog synthesis and drugs that target coagulation and immune processes.

== Early history ==
Drs. Haseltine, Engleman, and Strober established the company, initially named Activated Cell Therapy, in Mountain View, California, after securing funding from Health Care Ventures in Edison, New Jersey. The company successfully brought to market the first approved cell-based immune therapy, Provenge, for the treatment of metastatic prostate cancer After several years the company changed its name to Dendreon and moved to Seattle, Washington, under Christopher Henney.

== Provenge ==
Initial clinical results for Provenge in 2000 showed immune responses supporting the expected mode-of-action, as well as a PSA reduction which was thought to relate to clinical improvement. In 2006, Dendreon built a manufacturing facility in Morris Plains, New Jersey to accommodate production for a Phase III trial and possible 2007 drug approval by the U.S. Food and Drug Administration (FDA). In January 2007, the FDA accepted Dendreon's Biologic License Application (BLA) filing for Provenge.

On March 29, 2007, the FDA Office of Cellular, Tissue and Gene Therapies Advisory Committee voted 17-0 that Provenge is reasonably safe and 13-4 that the trial data showed substantial evidence that it is effective. However, on May 9, 2007, Dendreon received a letter from the FDA demanding more results and information before approval.

On April 14, 2009, Dendreon announced that the results for the Phase III trial of Provenge were positive, saying there had been a reduction in the odds of death compared to the use of a placebo. On April 28, 2009, the full details of the study were released. The trial found that patients treated with Provenge lived an average of 4.1 months longer than patients treated with the control (autologous cells without the GM-CSF / PAP fusion protein).

On April 29, 2010, the FDA approved Provenge for use in the treatment of advanced prostate cancer.

On June 7, 2010, the head of Medicare's Coverage and Analysis Group, Dr. Louis Jacques, sent three colleagues an email telling them that they should be sure not to leak the fact that his Group was considering a cap on Medicare coverage of this treatment. News of that caution itself did inevitably leak, and the price of Dendreon's stock fell 10% later that day.

== Dendreonites ==
Some journalists have referred to Provenge supporters as "Dendreonites" and the name is in routine usage in colloquial forums. Concerns for personal safety were raised among some doctors who were thought responsible for the delay of Provenge approval. Dendreonites have questioned these doctors' objectivity; one of them, Dr. Howard Scher, was the lead clinical trial investigator for a rival prostate cancer drug from the biotech company Novacea. Their concerns motivated organized protests at the FDA and American Society of Clinical Oncology (ASCO) meeting by various patient and investor advocacy groups which also filed a lawsuit alleging that the FDA's decision was influenced by conflicts of interest.
