= Sipuleucel-T =

Medication

Clinical data
- Trade names: Provenge
- Other names: APC8015
- AHFS/Drugs.com: Micromedex Detailed Consumer Information
- MedlinePlus: a611025
- License data: US DailyMed: Sipuleucel-T
- Pregnancy category: N/A (only approved in men, prostate cancer)
- Routes of administration: Intravenous
- ATC code: L03AX17 (WHO)

Legal status
- Legal status: US: ℞-only

Identifiers
- CAS Number: 917381-47-6
- DrugBank: DB06688
- ChemSpider: None
- UNII: 8Q622VDR18
- KEGG: D06644
- ChEMBL: ChEMBL1237024
- CompTox Dashboard (EPA): DTXSID50872279

Sipuleucel-T, sold under the brand name Provenge, developed by Dendreon Pharmaceuticals, LLC, is a cell-based cancer immunotherapy for prostate cancer (CaP). It is an autologous cellular immunotherapy.

== Medical uses ==
Sipuleucel-T is indicated for the treatment of metastatic, asymptomatic or minimally symptomatic, metastatic castrate-resistant hormone-refractory prostate cancer (HRPC). Other names for this stage are metastatic castrate-resistant (mCRPC) and androgen independent (AI) or (AIPC). This stage leads to mCRPC with lymph node involvement and distal (distant) tumors; this is the lethal stage of CaP. The prostate cancer staging designation is T4,N1,M1c.

=== Treatment method ===
A course of treatment consists of three basic steps:

- The patient's white blood cells, primarily dendritic cells, a type of antigen-presenting cells (APCs), are extracted in a leukapheresis procedure.
- The blood product is sent to a production facility and incubated with a fusion protein (PA2024) consisting of two parts:
  - The antigen prostatic acid phosphatase (PAP), which is present in 95% of prostate cancer cells and
  - An immune signaling factor granulocyte-macrophage colony stimulating factor (GM-CSF) that helps the APCs to mature.
- The activated blood product (APC8015) is returned from the production facility to the infusion center and reinfused into the patient.

Premedication with acetaminophen and antihistamine is recommended to minimize side effects.

== Side effects ==
Common side effects include: bladder pain; bloating or swelling of the face, arms, hands, lower legs, or feet; bloody or cloudy urine; body aches or pain; chest pain; chills; confusion; cough; diarrhea; difficult, burning, or painful urination; difficulty with breathing; difficulty with speaking up to inability to speak; double vision; sleeplessness; and inability to move the arms, legs, or facial muscles.

== Society and culture ==
=== Legal status ===
Sipuleucel-T was approved by the US Food and Drug Administration (FDA) in April 2010, to treat asymptomatic or minimally symptomatic metastatic HRPC.

Sipuleucel-T was added to the compendium of cancer treatments as a "category 1" (highest recommendation) treatment for HRPC. The National Comprehensive Cancer Network (NCCN) Compendium is used by Medicare and major health care insurance providers to decide whether a treatment should be reimbursed.

== Research ==
=== Clinical trials ===
==== Completed ====
Sipuleucel-T showed overall survival (OS) benefit to patients in three double-blind randomized phase III clinical trials, D9901, D9902a, and IMPACT.

The IMPACT trial served as the basis for FDA licensing. This trial enrolled 512 patients with asymptomatic or minimally symptomatic metastatic HRPC randomized in a 2:1 ratio. The median survival time for sipuleucel-T patients was 25.8 months comparing to 21.7 months for placebo-treated patients, an increase of 4.1 months. 31.7% of treated patients survived for 36 months vs. 23.0% in the control arm.

==== Ongoing ====
As of August 2014, the PRO Treatment and Early Cancer Treatment (PROTECT) trial, a phase IIIB clinical trial started in 2001, was tracking subjects but no longer enrolling new subjects. Its purpose is to test efficacy for patients whose CaP is still controlled by either suppression of testosterone by hormone treatment or by surgical castration. Such patients have usually failed primary treatment of either surgical removal of the prostate, (EBRT), internal radiation, BNCT or (HIFU) for curative intent. Such failure is called biochemical failure and is defined as a PSA reading of 2.0 ng/mL above nadir (the lowest reading taken post primary treatment).

As of August 2014, a clinical trial administering sipuleucel-T in conjunction with ipilimumab (Yervoy) was tracking subjects but no longer enrolling new subjects; the trial evaluates the clinical safety and anti-cancer effects (quantified in PSA, radiographic and T cell response) of the combination therapy in patients with advanced prostate cancer.

Results from the large PROCEED registry, which enrolled men between 2011 and 2017, showed that men with metastatic castration-resistant prostate cancer had a median overall survival of approximately 30.7 months from the date of treatment, and that people with lower PSA levels had longer survival. Research also found that African American men treated with Sipuleucel-T had similar or sometimes better survival than non-African American men, along with stronger immune activity, including higher levels of immune markers like ICOS, GM-CSF, CCL4 and CCL5. These immune markers fit with the treatment's ability to stimulate antigen-presenting cells and downstream T-cell activity.
