= Melanoma-associated antigen =

Cellular antigens specific for melanoma cells

MAGE family

Identifiers
- Symbol: MAGE
- Pfam: PF01454
- InterPro: IPR002190
- SCOP2: 1i4f / SCOPe / SUPFAM
Available protein structures:
- PDB: 1i4fC:230-239 1qewC:271-279 IPR002190 PF01454 (ECOD; PDBsum)
- AlphaFold: IPR002190; PF01454

The mammalian members of the MAGE (melanoma-associated antigen) gene family were originally described as completely silent in normal adult tissues, with the exception of male germ cells and, for some of them, placenta. By contrast, these genes were expressed in various kinds of tumors.

MAGE-like genes have also been identified in non-mammalian species, like the zebrafish or Drosophila melanogaster. Although no MAGE homologous sequences have been identified in Caenorhabditis elegans, Saccharomyces cerevisiae or Schizosaccharomyces pombe, MAGE sequences have been found in several plant species, including Arabidopsis thaliana.

The only region of homology shared by all of the members of the family is a stretch of about 200 amino acids which has been named the MAGE conserved domain. The MAGE conserved domain is usually located close to the C-terminus, although it can also be found in a more central position in some proteins. The MAGE conserved domain is generally present as a single copy but it is duplicated in some proteins. It has been proposed that the MAGE conserved domain of MAGE-D proteins might interact with p75 neurotrophin or related receptors.

== Human proteins containing this domain ==
MAGE-B1; MAGEA1; MAGEA10; MAGEA11; MAGEA12; MAGEA2B; MAGEA3; MAGEA4; MAGEA6; MAGEA8; MAGEA9; MAGEB1; MAGEB10; MAGEB16; MAGEB18; MAGEB2; MAGEB3; MAGEB4; MAGEB5; MAGEB6; MAGEB6B; MAGEC1; MAGEC2; MAGEC3; MAGED1; MAGED2; MAGED4; MAGEE1; MAGEE2; MAGEF1; MAGEH1; MAGEL2; NDN; NDNL2;
