= Lloyd J. Old =

American immunologist (1933–2011)

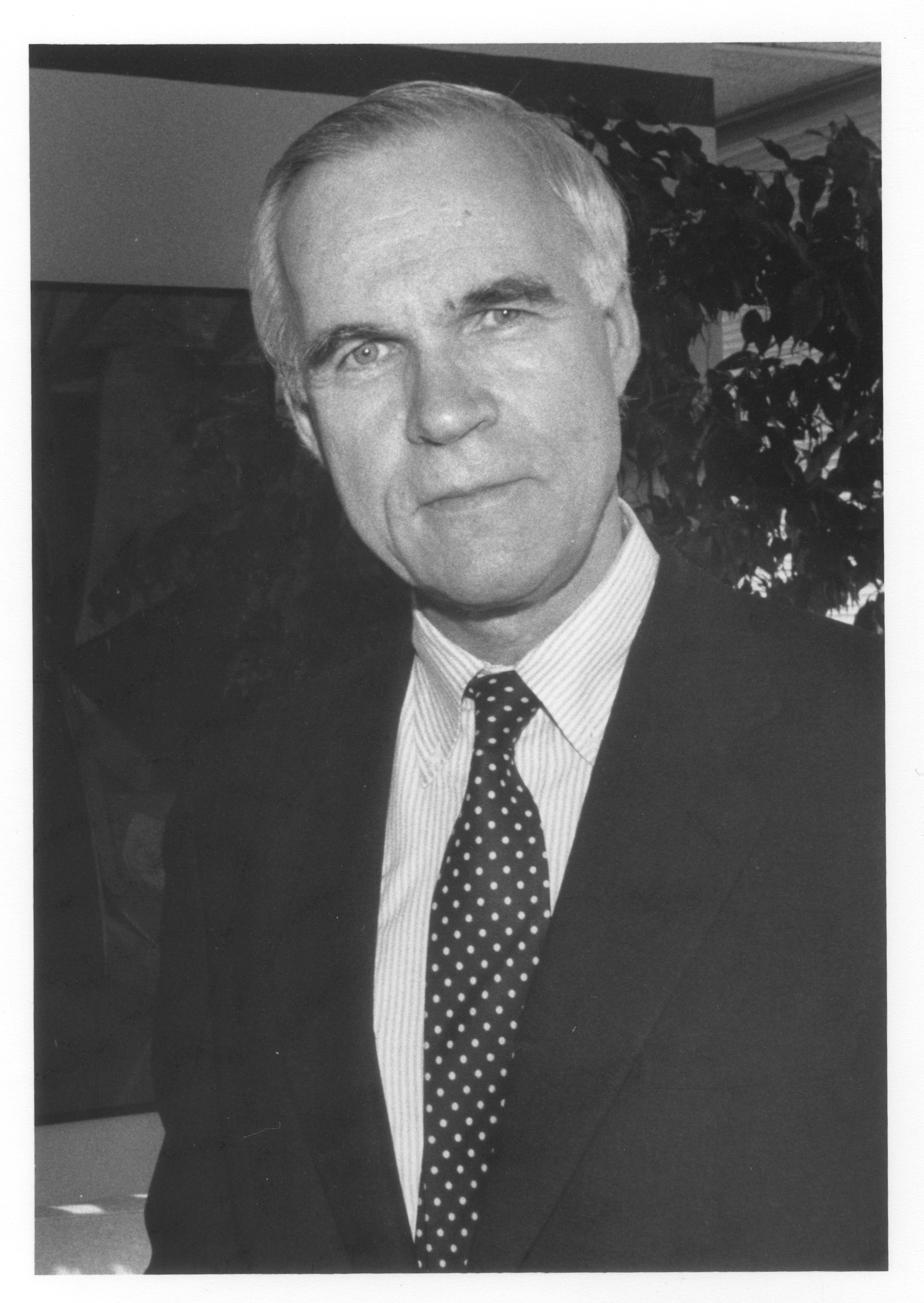
Lloyd J. Old, M.D., c. 1995

Lloyd John Old (September 23, 1933 – November 28, 2011) was an American medical researcher, and one of the founders of the field of cancer immunology. When Old began his career in 1958, tumor immunology was in its infancy. Today, cancer immunotherapies are a significant advance in cancer therapy.

== Life ==
Old held the William E. Snee Chair of Cancer Immunology at Memorial Sloan Kettering Cancer Center (MSKCC), where he was director of the Ludwig Cancer Research New York Branch (then known as Ludwig Institute for Cancer Research, or LICR). He was also a trustee of the LICR Charitable Trust, and a trustee of the Virginia & D.K. Ludwig Fund for Cancer Research.6. From 1971 to 2011, he served as the founding scientific and medical director of the Cancer Research Institute (CRI), where from 2001 to 2011 he also served as director of the CRI/LICR Cancer Vaccine Collaborative (CVC), an international network dedicated to testing and optimizing therapeutic cancer vaccines. Old's previous appointments included chairman of the LICR board of directors (2006–2009), LICR scientific director (1988 to 2005), member of the Emeritus LICR Scientific Committee (1971–86), LICR chief executive officer (1995–2004), and associate director of research at MSKCC (1973–83).

Old served as a member of scientific advisory boards and committees including the Public Health Research Institute of the City of New York, the National Cancer Institute, and the American Association for Cancer Research. Old was also a member of the American Association for Cancer Research, New York Academy of Sciences, Reticuloendothelial Society, Society of Experimental Biology and Medicine, American Association for the Advancement of Science, American Association of Immunologists, National Academy of Sciences, the Academy of Cancer Immunology, and the American Academy of Arts and Sciences. He had also received honorary doctor of medicine degrees from Karolinska Institute, the University of Lausanne, and the University College London. He graduated from the University of California, Berkeley with a B.A. in biology and earned a medical degree from the University of California, San Francisco.

Old died November 28, 2011, at his New York City home, after several years battling advanced prostate cancer.

== Work ==
Old's contributions to research established many of the principles of tumor immunology. In earlier work, he and his colleagues introduced bacillus Calmette–Guérin (BCG) to tumor immunotherapy; discovered the first link between the major histocompatibility complex (MHC) and disease (leukemia); found the unexpected association between Epstein–Barr virus (EBV) and nasopharyngeal carcinoma; discovered Tumor necrosis factors (TNF); defined the concept of cell-surface differentiation antigens with the discovery of TL, Lyt (CD8), and a range of other mouse antigenic systems; discovered p53, independently with two other groups; and identified the tumor immunogenicity of heat shock proteins. Old was the author or coauthor of more than 800 research publications. He was also a teacher helping young researchers as they began their careers.

== Major discoveries ==
- Introduced Bacille Calmette-Guérin (BCG), the tuberculosis vaccine, into experimental cancer research as a way to stimulate non-specific resistance to tumor growth. BCG was FDA-approved in 1991 and is now widely used as a first line treatment for superficial bladder cancer (1959).
- Discovered the first linkage between the major histocompatibility complex (MHC) and disease—mouse leukemia—opening the way for the recognition of the importance of the MHC in the immune response (1964).
- Identified the first cell surface antigens distinguishing cells of different lineages, introducing the concept of cell surface antigens that could differentiate different cell types. First coined TL (for “thymus-leukemia” antigen in mice) then later as the Ly series (originally named Ly-A and Ly-B and later called Ly-1, Ly-2, and Ly-3), this discovery led directly to the wide use of cell surface markers to distinguish and classify normal and malignant cells and the development of CD classification (for “clusters of differentiation”). Most notably, Dr. Old discovered the LY-B antigen, later renamed CD8 in humans. CD8 cells, often referred to as “killer” T cells, are one of the major cells of the adaptive immune response, and are capable of directly killing dangerous or foreign cells (1964–1968).
- Discovery of the association between Epstein-Barr Virus (EBV) and nasopharyngeal cancer (1966).
- Discovery of tumor necrosis factor (TNF), a key immune signaling molecule (cytokine) that, in addition to its promise for the treatment of cancer and other diseases, has provided a powerful research tool in biomedicine (nearly 88,000 articles in PubMed as of May 25, 2011) (1975).
- Identification (independently, along with two other groups) of the p53 protein, the gene for which is mutated in approximately 50 percent of cancers (1979).
- Conducting of the most comprehensive dissection of the cell surface of human cancers using monoclonal antibodies, with the identification of an array of cell surface antigens as targets for antibody-based therapies of human cancer. Of the monoclonal antibodies developed in Dr. Old's laboratory, thirteen have been licensed and seven are in clinical trials. These include:
  - MORAb-003 (farletuzumab), currently in a phase III trial for ovarian cancer sponsored by Morphotek, which licensed the antibody from LICR. MORAb-003 targets the folate receptor alpha, which is overexpressed on a number of epithelial cancers, including ovarian, breast, renal, lung, colorectal and brain cancers.
  - the anti-EGFr antibody Hu806, which Abbott Laboratories acquired exclusive world-wide rights to develop in a major licensing deal in 2008. Hu806 targets the overexpressed form of the epidermal growth factor receptor (EGFr) present in 50 percent of all cancers of epithelial origin.
  - cG250 (girentuximab, Rencarex®/Redectane®), which targets the CA-IX molecule/G250 antigen, expressed on over 90 percent of clear cells renal cell carcinomas (RCC, kidney cancer), and is in phase III clinical trials as a diagnostic tool and as a therapeutic modality (also iodine-131-G250).
  - hu3S193, which targets the LeY antigen, an oligosaccharide epitope expressed on glycolipids and glycoproteins by a wide range of epithelial cancers, is in phase II clinical trials being conducted by LICR spin-off company Recepta Biopharma.
  - huA33, which targets the A33 antigen present on colorectal cancer cells. The antibody has been licensed to LICR spin-off company Life Sciences Pharmaceuticals, and the mAb's therapeutic potential is being tested as a stand-alone antibody, as a radioimmunotherapy agent, and in combination with chemotherapy.
- Establishment of the autologous typing system as the methodology leading to the identification of the first specific human tumor antigens recognized by antibodies and T cells, created 150 separate cancer cell lines, and laid the groundwork for the development of SEREX by Pfreundschuh in 1995.
- Discovery and naming of several members of the CT (cancer/testis) family of human tumor antigens, including New York-ESO-1 (NY-ESO-1). NY-ESO-1 is one of the most immunogenic human tumor antigens discovered to date and is expressed in approximately 35 percent of melanomas, 30 percent of breast cancers, 30 percent of liver cancers, 25 percent of lung cancers, less than five percent of colon cancers.
- Contribution to the resurrection of the cancer immunosurveillance hypothesis and to the development of the expanded model of cancer immunoediting.
- Establishment in 2001 of the Cancer Vaccine Collaborative (CVC), the world's first network of clinical trial sites closely linked with immunological monitoring laboratories with the goal to develop effective therapeutic cancer vaccines by first understanding the fundamental immunological implications of vaccination and applying that knowledge toward the rational design of optimal vaccine formulations. A joint program of the Cancer Research Institute and Ludwig Cancer Research, the CVC conducts parallel, early phase, single variable clinical trials of various cancer vaccine formulations and combinations composed of cancer-specific antigen, immunological adjuvant, vaccine delivery platforms, and modulators of immune suppression.
- Founder of "The Academy of Cancer Immunology [which] was established in 1998 to advance understanding of the role of immunity in cancer and to recognize outstanding achievements in the field of cancer immunology. The Academy currently has 53 members from 11 countries and holds annual elections for Academy membership."

== Leadership ==
As director of the international Ludwig Institute for Cancer Research for 17 years, scientific director of the Cancer Research Institute for 40 years, and his previous appointment as associate director of research at Memorial Sloan-Kettering Cancer Center for 10 years, Dr. Old guided the scientific vision of several institutions and the training and development of generations of young scientists in many fields.

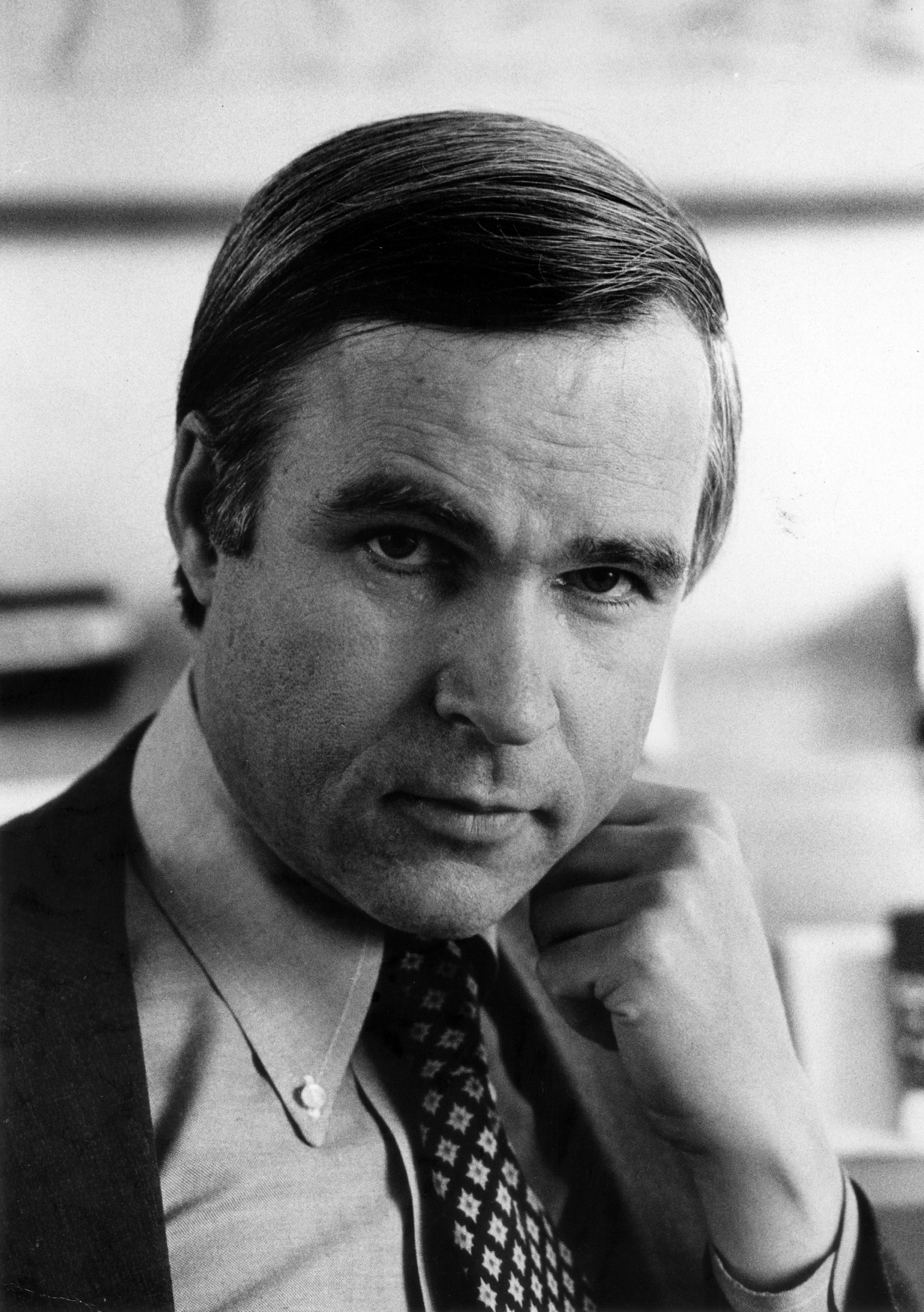
Lloyd J. Old, M.D., c. 1974

Memorial Sloan-Kettering Cancer Center (MSKCC)

- Memorial Hospital for Cancer and Allied Diseases
  - 1973-1976: Vice president and associate director
  - 1976-1986: Vice president and associate director for scientific development
- Memorial Sloan-Kettering Cancer Center
  - 1973-1983: Associate director of research
- Ludwig Institute for Cancer Research, New York Branch at MSKCC
  - Director, 1990–2011

Ludwig Institute for Cancer Research (Ludwig Cancer Research)

- 1988-2005: Director
- 1989–present: Member, board of directors
- 1995-2004: Chief executive officer
- 2006-2008: Chairman, board of directors

Virginia and Daniel K. Ludwig Trust

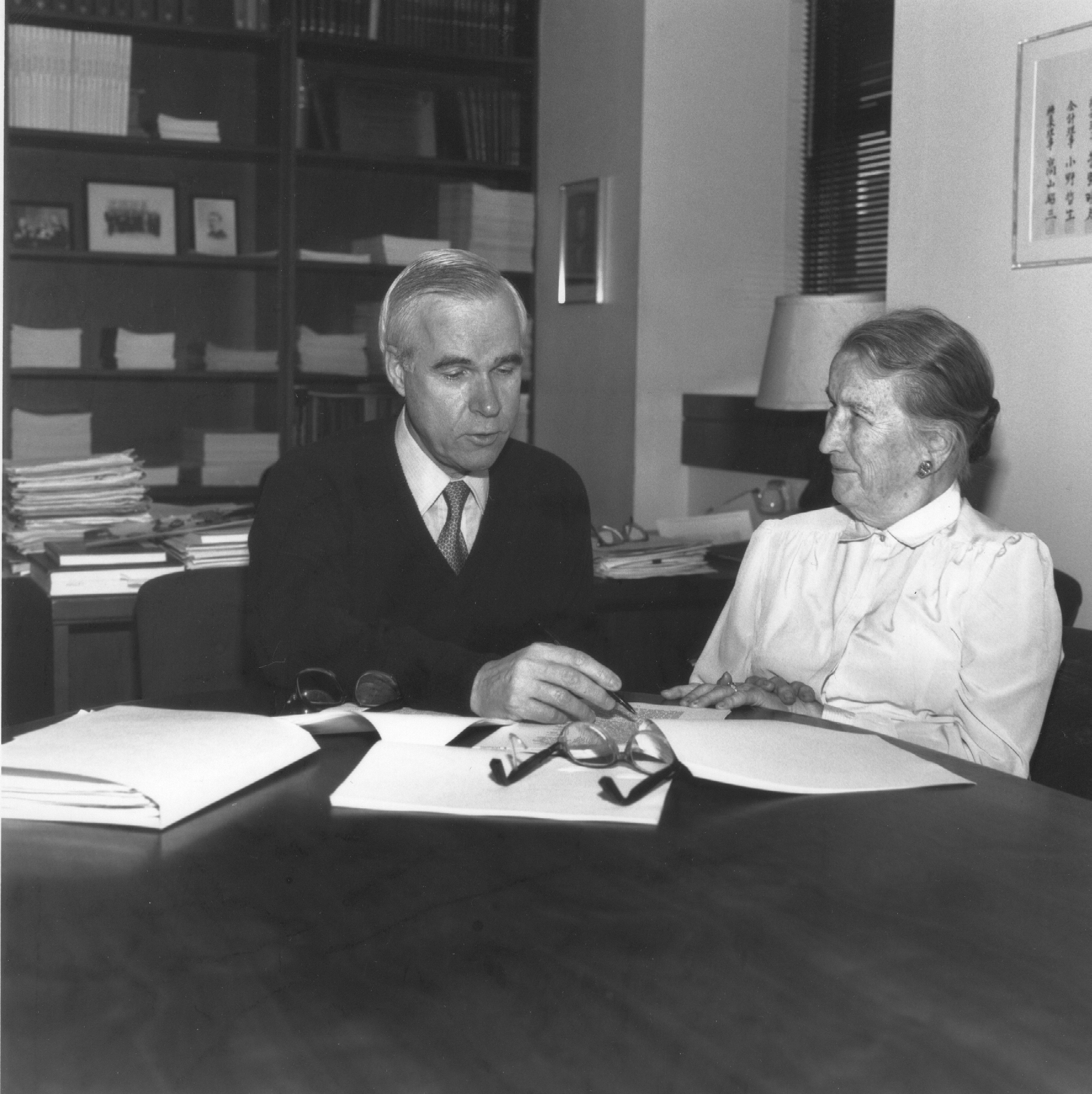
Lloyd J. Old, M.D., with Cancer Research Institute founder Helen Coley Nauts, Cancer Research Institute (CRI)

- 1968-1971: Scientific advisor
- 1971-2011: Scientific director

CRI/LICR Cancer Vaccine Collaborative (CVC)

- 2001-2011: Director

== Awards ==
- 1957: Roche Award from Roche Pharmaceuticals
- 1958: Alpha Omega Alpha
- 1970: Lucy Wortham James Award, James Ewing Society
- 1972: Lecturer, The Harvey Society of New York
- 1972: Louis Gross Award
- 1974: Member, Institute of Medicine, U.S. National Academy of Sciences
- 1975: Cancer Research Institute William B. Coley Award for Discoveries in Basic and Tumor Immunology (honored as one of the "Founders of Tumor Immunology")
- 1976: Member, American Academy of Arts and Sciences
- 1976: Rabbi Shai Shacknai Memorial Prize in Immunology and Cancer Research, Hebrew University of Jerusalem
- 1978: Member, National Academy of Sciences
- 1978: Research Recognition Award, Noble Assembly
- 1980: G.H.A. Clowes Memorial Award, the American Association for Cancer Research
- 1981: Robert Roesler de Villiers Award, Leukemia Society of America
- 1985: New York Academy of Medicine Medal for Distinguished Contributions in Biomedical Science
- 1986: Honorary member, Japanese Cancer Association
- 1990: Robert Koch Prize, Robert Koch Foundation
- 1994: Honorary Doctor of Medicine, Karolinska Institute
- 1995: Honorary Doctor of Medicine, University of Lausanne
- 1997: Honorary Doctor of Sciences (Medicine), University College London
- 2004: President's Medal, Johns Hopkins University
- 2004: Dean's Award, Stanford University School of Medicine
- 2004: Honorary professor, Peking University
- 2007: Charles Rodolphe Brupbacher Prize for Cancer Research, the Charles Rodolphe Brupbacher Foundation, Zürich
- 2011: C. Chester Stock Award Lectureship, Memorial Sloan-Kettering Cancer Center
