= Tumor antigen =

Antigenic substance produced in tumor cells

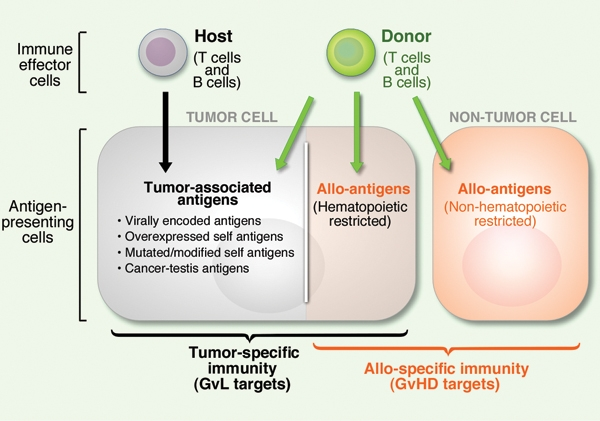
The spectrum of target antigens associated with tumor immunity and allo-immunity after allogeneic hematopoietic stem cell transplantation. Host-derived T and B cells can be induced to recognize tumor-associated antigens, whereas donor-derived B and T cells can recognize both tumor-associated antigens and alloantigens.

Tumor antigen is a substance produced in tumor cells that triggers an immune response in the host. Tumor antigens are used tumor markers to identify tumor cells with diagnostic tests. The broader field of cancer immunology studies tumor antigens and other ways of provoking the immune system to attack tumor cells.

== Mechanism of tumor antigenesis ==
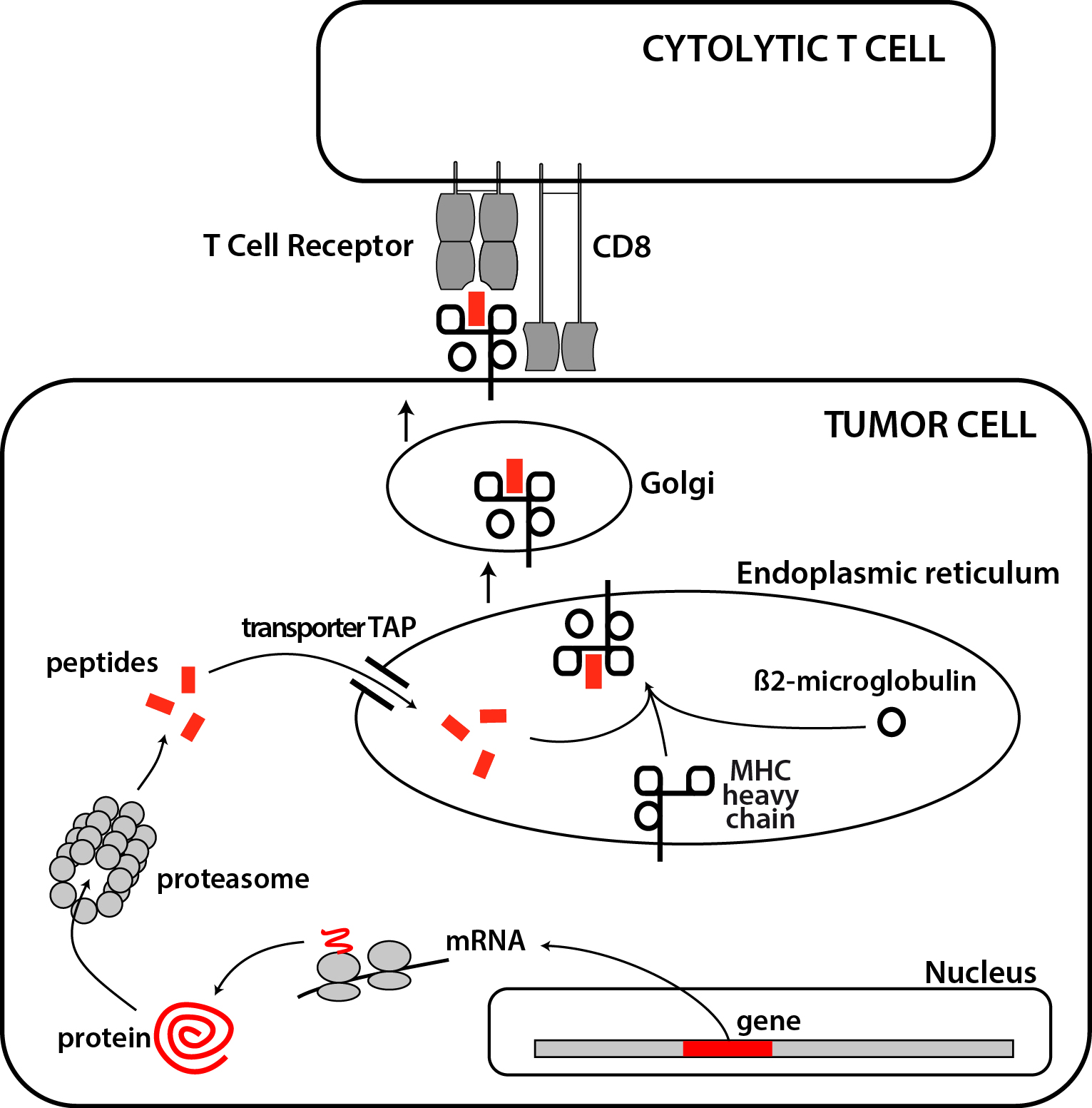
Processing of tumor antigens recognized by CD8+ T cells

Tumor cells produce proteins and substances that normal cells do not. Any protein that was not previously exposed to the immune system can trigger an immune response. These are typically intracellular molecules, and may include normal proteins that are well sequestered from the immune system, proteins that are normally produced in extremely small quantities, proteins that are normally produced only in certain stages of development, or proteins whose structure is modified due to mutation. These aberrant proteins are presented on the surface of tumor cells by the major histocompatibility complex (MHC) proteins, also known as human leukocyte antigens (HLA). Where they interact with cytotoxic T cells triggering a response that results in tumor cell destruction.

These proteins may also be found freely floating in the blood and not solely displayed on the tumor cell surface. Cancer-associated or cancer-specific antigens have been identified in most human cancers.

== Mechanism of immune invasion ==
Recent studies show that tumor cells evade macrophage phagocytosis by over-expressing inhibitory ligands such as CD47, which bind to the SIRPα receptor on macrophages and transmit a “don’t eat me” signal. This pathway counteracts pro-phagocytosis “eat me” cues such as Fc receptor engagement that would be normally triggered by opsonizing antibodies. In the tumor microenvironment, cytokines like TGF-β and IL-10 further reinforce this suppression by polarizing macrophages to an immunosuppressive phenotype with reduced antigen-presenting activity, weakening their ability to cross-present the tumor-associated neoantigens to T cells. By suppressing both phagocytosis and neoantigen presentation, tumor cells reduce visibility to the immune system where they contribute to greater antigenic diversity. Together, these mechanisms allow tumor cells to avoid both direct macrophage clearance and antibody-mediated immune destruction.

== Classification of tumor antigens ==
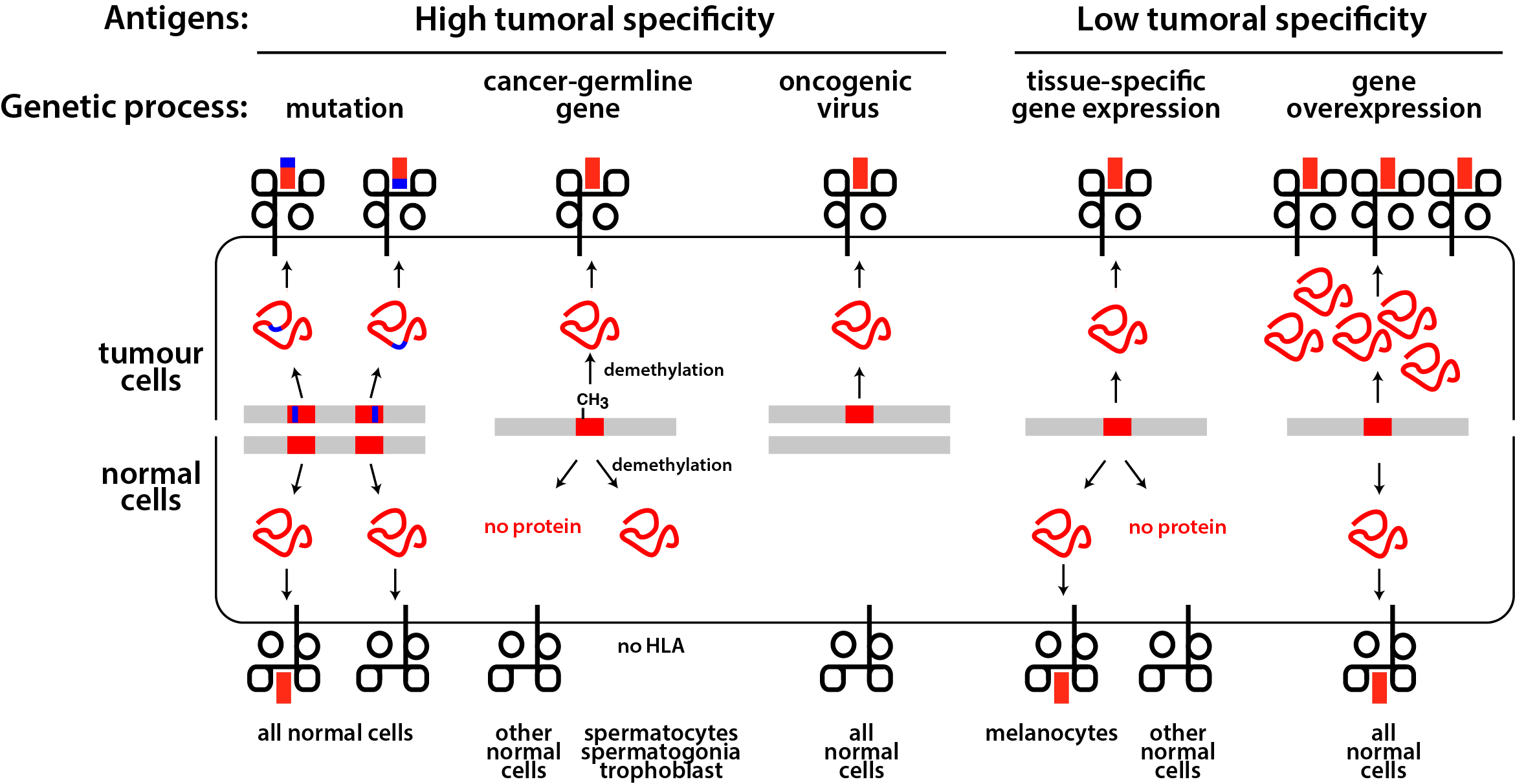
Classes of human tumor antigens recognized by T lymphocytes, with their genetic process

Any protein produced in a tumor cell that has an abnormal structure due to mutation can act as a tumor antigen. Such abnormal proteins are produced due to mutation of the concerned gene. In addition to proteins, other substances like cell surface glycolipids and glycoproteins may also have an abnormal structure in tumor cells and could thus be targets of the immune system.

Normal cells will display the normal protein antigen on their MHC molecules, whereas cancer cells will display the mutant version.

Initially tumor antigens were broadly classified into two categories based on their pattern of expression: tumor-specific antigens (TSA), which are present only on tumor cells and not on any other cell and tumor-associated antigens (TAA), which are present on some tumor cells and also some normal cells.

This classification, however, is imperfect because many antigens thought to be tumor-specific turned out to be expressed on some normal cells as well. The modern classification of tumor antigens is based on their molecular structure and source.

Accordingly, they can be classified as:

- Products of mutated oncogenes and tumor suppressor genes
- Cell membrane proteins typically hidden from immune recognition due to defective membrane homeostasis in tumor cells
- Antigenic proteins that are normally sequestered within the cell or its organelles, but released when tumor cells die.
- Products of other mutated genes
- Altered cell surface glycolipids and glycoproteins
- Cell type–specific differentiation antigens

=== Oncofetal ===
These proteins are normally produced in the early stages of embryonic development and disappear by the time the immune system is fully developed. Thus self-tolerance does not develop against these antigens. Examples of oncofetal proteins include alphafetoprotein (AFP), carcinoembryonic antigen (CEA) in colorectal carcinoma, immature laminin receptor in renal cell carcinoma, and TAG-72 in prostate carcinoma.

=== Oncoviral ===
Abnormal proteins are also produced by cells infected with oncoviruses, e.g. EBV and the E6 and E7 proteins in HPV. Cells infected by these viruses contain latent viral DNA which is transcribed and the resulting protein produces an immune response.

=== Overexpressed / accumulated ===
These antigens are overexpressed or aberrantly expressed cellular proteins These include proteins produced at high levels that normally are present at lower levels (e.g., prostate-specific antigens, melanoma-associated antigens) Proteins that are normally produced in very low quantities but whose production is dramatically increased in tumor cells, trigger an immune response. An example of such a protein is the enzyme tyrosinase, which is required for melanin production. Normally tyrosinase is produced in minute quantities but its levels are very much elevated in melanoma cells.

=== Cancer / testes ===
Cancer-testis antigens are antigens expressed primarily in the germ cells of the testes, but also in fetal ovaries and the trophoblast.

=== Mutated ===
These are proteins that are normally expressed in cells, but become altered through mutation. The genes may be encoded by mutated genes, intronic sequences, or translated alternative open reading frames, pseudogenes, antisense strands, or represent the products of gene translocation events. Examples include β-catenin in melanoma, prostate, and hepatocellular carcinoma, BRCA1/BRCA2 in breast and ovarian carcinoma, MART-2 in melanoma, TGF-βRII in colorectal carcinoma CML66 in chronic myeloid leukemia, CDK4 and fibronectin, p53, and ras in multiple cancers. Some cancer cells aberrantly express these proteins and therefore present these antigens, allowing attack by T-cells specific to these antigens. Example antigens of this type are CTAG1B and MAGEA1.

=== Lineage restricted ===
Tissue differentiation antigens are those that are specific to a certain type of tissue.

== Importance of tumor antigens ==
Tumor antigens, because of their relative abundance in tumor cells are useful in identifying specific tumor cells. Certain tumors have certain tumor antigens in abundance.

Tumor antigen	Tumor in which it is found	Remarks
Alphafetoprotein (AFP)	Germ cell tumors Hepatocellular carcinoma	
Carcinoembryonic antigen (CEA)	Bowel cancers	Occasional lung or breast cancer
CA-125	Ovarian cancer	
MUC-1	Breast cancer	
Epithelial tumor antigen (ETA)	Breast cancer	
Tyrosinase	Melanoma	normally present in minute quantities; greatly elevated levels in melanoma
Melanoma-associated antigen (MAGE)	Melanoma	Also normally present in the testis
abnormal products of ras, p53	Various tumors	

Certain tumor antigens are thus used as tumor markers. More importantly, tumor antigens can be used in cancer therapy as tumor antigen vaccines.

== See also ==
- Cancer immunotherapy
