= MAGEB17 =

Human cancer-testis antigen protein

Identifiers
- Aliases: MAGEB17, MAGE family member B17
- External IDs: OMIM: 300763; MGI: 3645128; GeneCards: MAGEB17

Gene location (Human)
| Chr. | X chromosome (human) |
| Band | Xp22.2 | Start | 16,167,481 bp |
| Band | Xp22.2 | End | 16,171,464 bp |

Gene location (Mouse)
| Chr. | X chromosome (mouse) |
| Band | X|X C2 | Start | 90,975,552 bp |
| Band | X|X C2 | End | 90,976,586 bp |
RNA expression pattern
| Bgee | Human / Mouse (ortholog); Top expressed in: body of pancreas; gastric mucosa; stromal cell of endometrium; right testis; mucosa of transverse colon; skeletal muscle tissue; left testis; appendix; smooth muscle tissue; gastrocnemius muscle / Top expressed in: embryo; primary oocyte; spermatid; spermatocyte; testicle; More reference expression data |
| BioGPS | n/a |
Orthologs
| Databases | NCBI: entry; OMA: entry |
| Species | Human | Mouse |
| Entrez | 645864 | 278087 |
| Ensembl | ENSG00000182798 | ENSMUSG00000078123 |
| UniProt | A8MXT2 | n/a |
| RefSeq (mRNA) | NM_001277307 | NM_001083629; NM_001256004 |
| RefSeq (protein) | NP_001264236 | n/a |
| Location (UCSC) | Chr X: 16.17 – 16.17 Mb | Chr X: 90.98 – 90.98 Mb |
| PubMed search |
- Wikidata
| View/Edit Human | View/Edit Mouse |

Melanoma-associated antigen B17 (MAGEB17) is a protein which in humans is encoded by the MAGEB17 gene located on the X chromosome (Xp22.2). The protein has a molecular mass of approximately 37.4 kDa and an isoelectric point of approximately 9.25. MAGEB17 is classified as a cancer-testis antigen, with expression in normal adult tissues primarily restricted to germ cells and re-expression observed in a subset of human tumors.

== Gene ==
MAGEB17 is a protein-coding gene on chromosome X (Xp22.2), on the plus strand, spanning 3,984 bp across two exons. MAGEB17 is a member of the MAGEB gene family, in which the entire CDS is located within the last exon. MAGEB17 is classified as a cancer-testis antigen, with expression in normal adult tissues restricted to germ cells.

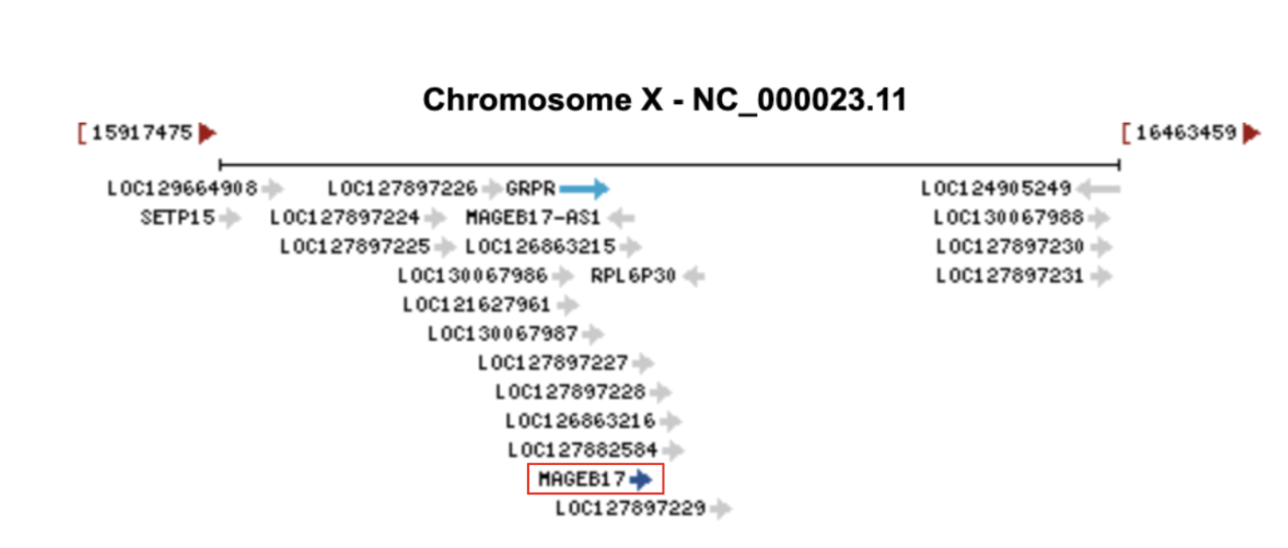
The MAGEB17 gene, with MAGEB17-AS1, the antisense RNA, annotated. Source: NCBI Gene.

== Transcripts ==
MAGEB17 produces a canonical transcript (NM_001277307.2) of 1,434 nt. One splice variant exists (XM_047442355.1, 1,566 nt), differing from the canonical transcript in the 5' UTR.

Conceptual Translation of Isoform 1 of Human MAGEB17

== Protein ==
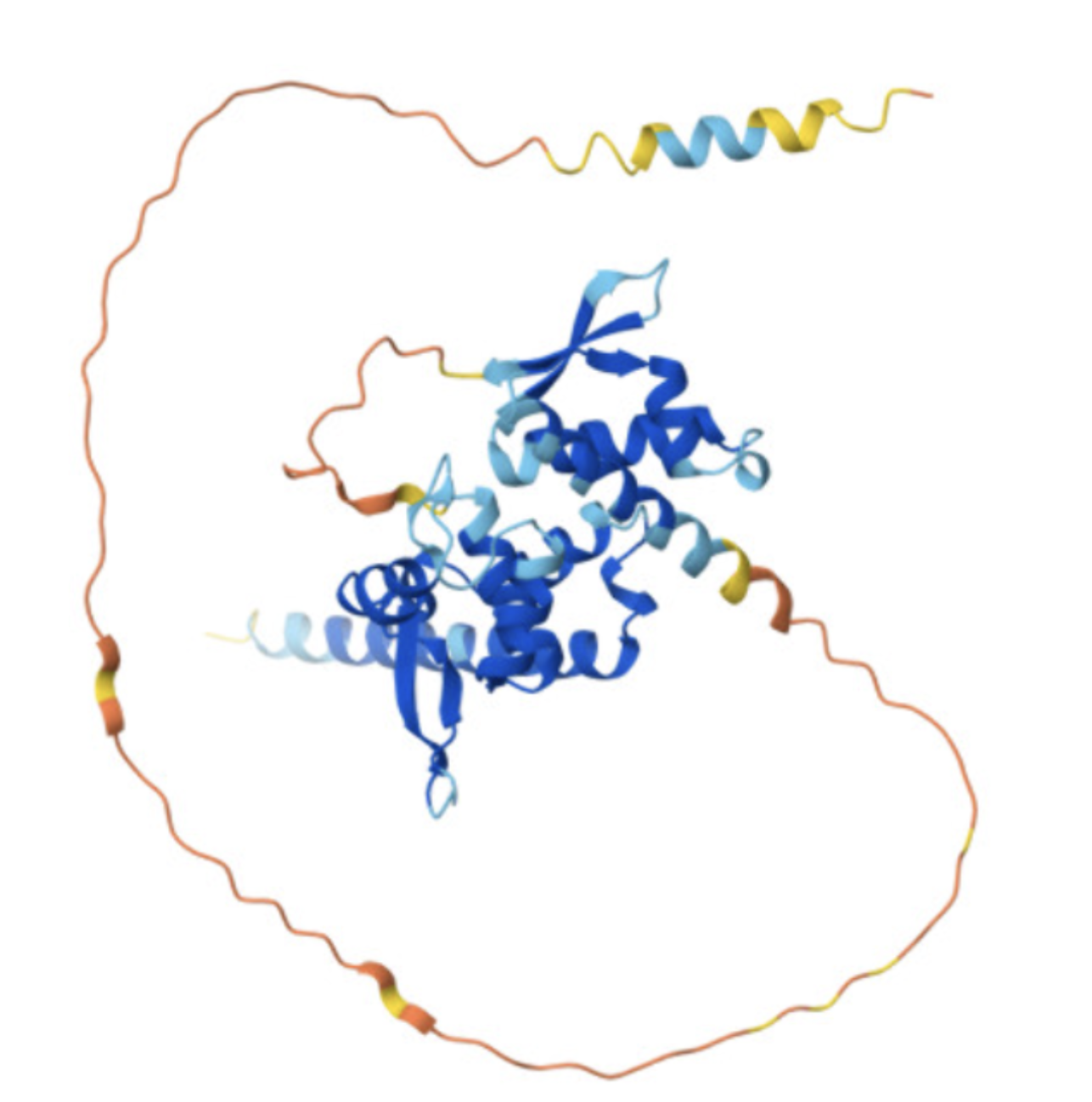
Predicted protein structure of MAGEB17, showing alpha helices and beta sheets.

The MAGEB17 gene produces two isoforms, both 336 amino acids in length. The canonical protein, Melanoma-associated antigen B17 (NP_001264236.1), has a predicted molecular mass of ~37.4 kDa and a theoretical isoelectric point of ~9.25, indicating a basic protein at physiological pH. Melanoma-associated antigen B17 isoform X1 (XP_047298311.1) is also 336 aa, differing from the canonical transcript in the 5' UTR. Gene Ontology annotations associate MAGEB17 with the negative regulation of transcription by RNA polymerase II and with activity in the nucleus.

=== Structure ===
The protein contains two conserved domains: an N-terminal MAGE domain (MAGE_N, residues 5–93) and a MAGE homology domain (MHD, residues 116–283). The MHD serves as a structural scaffold, a feature conserved across the MAGE protein family. Multiple sequence alignments indicate that a C-terminal core region flanks the MHD and is highly conserved across mammalian orthologs.

== Gene level regulation ==
=== Expression ===
MAGEB17 is non-ubiquitously expressed, with expression in normal adult tissues restricted to germ cells. Testis is the predominant site of expression, with all other normal adult tissues at near-zero levels. Expression is transiently detected in fetal heart tissue at 18 weeks gestational age. No substantial expression has been detected in any brain region in either fetal or adult tissue. In cancer, MAGEB17 is reactivated across a subset of tumor types including colon, rectal, and liver adenocarcinomas, and testicular germ cell tumors.

=== Promoter ===
The MAGEB17 promoter contains binding sites for transcription factors associated with cancer-testis antigen reactivation and germ cell biology, including STAT3, SRY, Nanog, and CREM. Promoter sequence conservation is largely restricted to primates, consistent with the primate-specific distribution of the MAGE gene family.

== Protein level regulation ==
MAGEB17 contains several experimentally confirmed and predicted regulatory modifications. Threonine 131 (T131), located at the MHD boundary, has been experimentally identified as a phosphorylation site and is conserved across mammalian orthologs. Two predicted SUMOylation sites exist at K88 and K292. A predicted SPOP degron motif is present at residues 39–43. A predicted MAPK docking motif at residues 152–160 suggests potential regulation by mitogen-activated protein kinase signaling.

=== Subcellular localization ===
MAGEB17 localizes primarily to the nucleus, consistent with two predicted nuclear localization signals at residues 7–12 and 126–145. A cytoplasmic pool has also been observed, potentially reflecting pre-import localization prior to nuclear transport.

== Homology and evolution ==
=== Paralogs ===
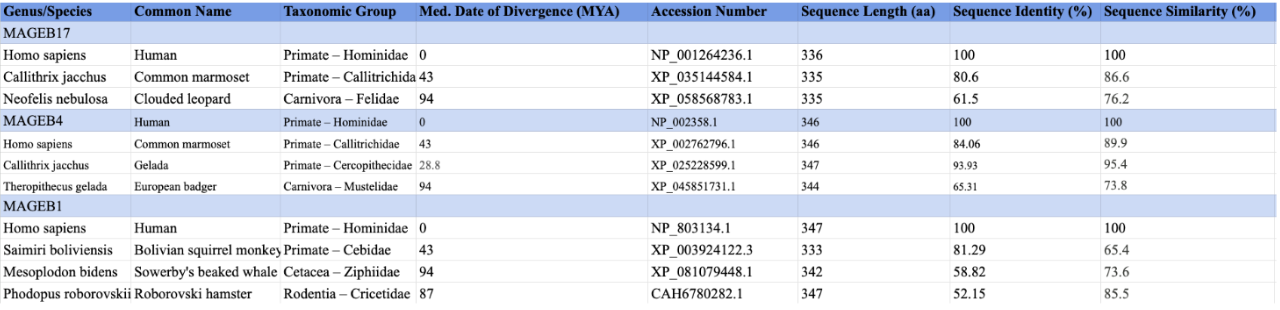
Comparison of MAGEB17, MAGEB4, and MAGEB1 paralogs across species with properties.

MAGEB17 is a member of the MAGE protein family, which comprises over 50 paralogs in humans. MAGEB4 shares greater sequence identity with MAGEB17 than MAGEB1, suggesting a closer evolutionary relationship within the MAGE-B subfamily.

=== Orthologs ===
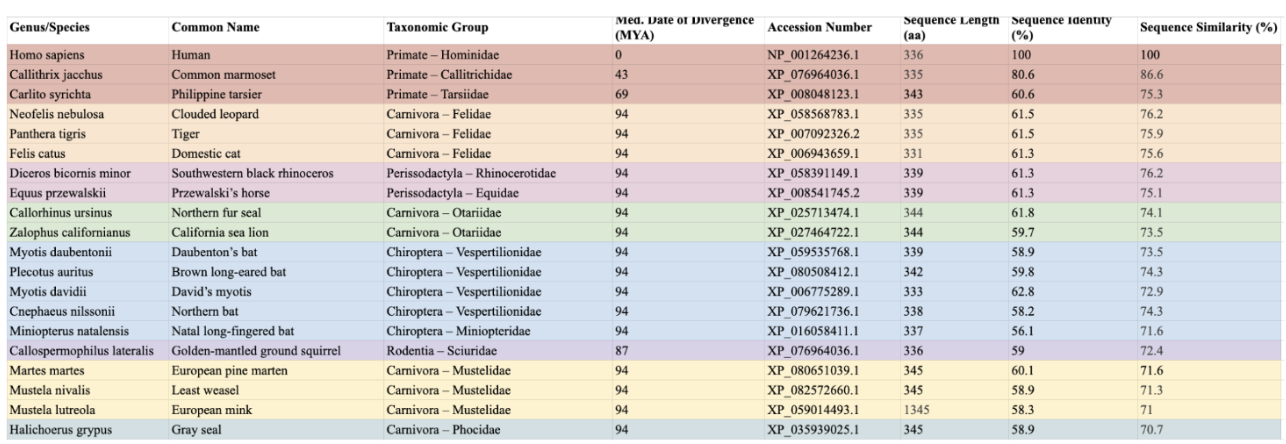
Table of MAGEB1's Orthologs and related properties.

MAGEB17 orthologs are found exclusively in mammals, consistent with the mammal-specific expansion of the MAGE protein family. Sequence identity decreases with increasing evolutionary distance from humans.

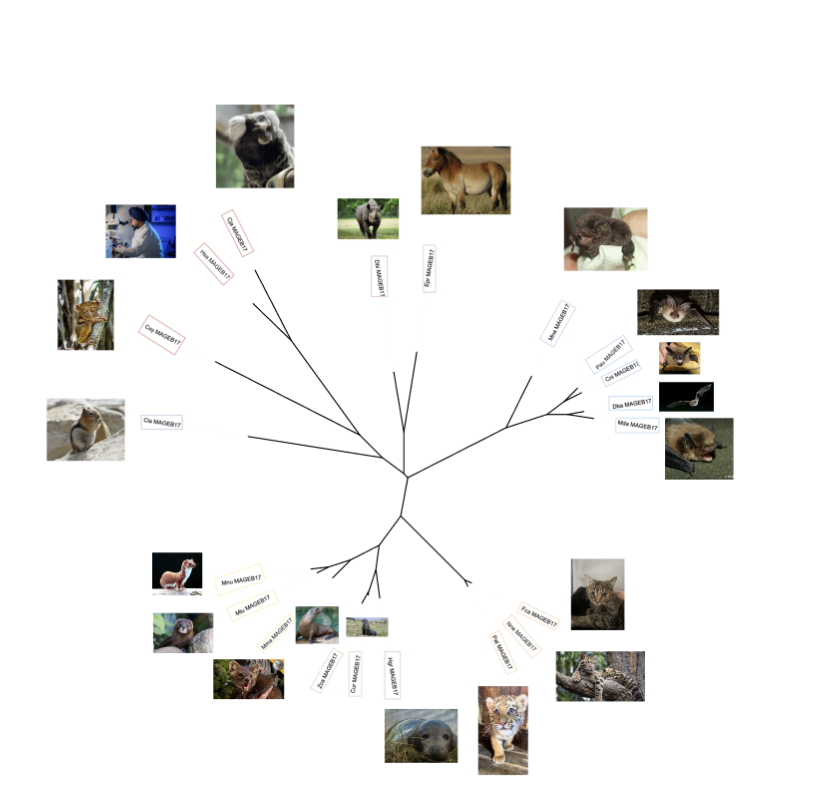
Phylogenetic Tree of MAGEB17

=== Rate of divergence ===
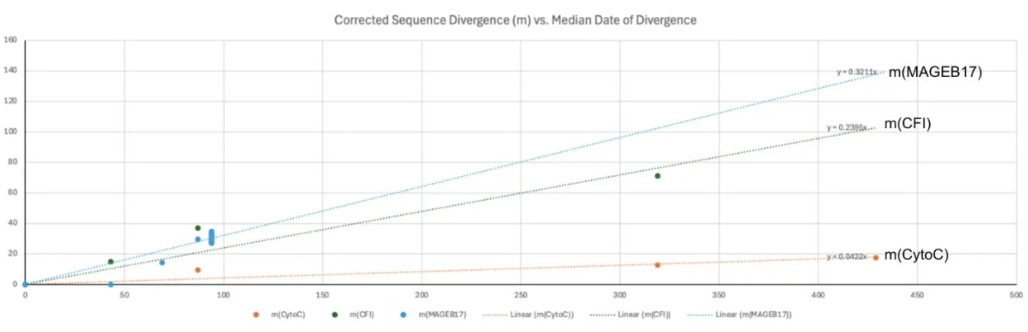
Figure 5: Corrected Sequence Divergence vs. Median Date of Divergence. Graph made on Microsoft Excel, using data from NIH.

MAGEB17 diverges more rapidly than both Cytochrome c and Complement factor I, suggesting relatively weak purifying selection on the protein sequence compared to these broadly expressed proteins.

=== Distant homologs ===
The most distant detectable homolog is the Drosophila melanogaster MAGE protein, sharing 16.9% sequence identity with human MAGEB17, with conservation restricted to the MAGE homology domain.

== Interacting proteins ==
MAGEB17 Protein Interactions - Source:STRING

STRING analysis identifies several predicted functional partners for MAGEB17, primarily on the basis of co-expression and text mining. No experimentally validated protein-protein interactions have been identified for MAGEB17 in BioGRID. A single genetic interaction with LDLR is recorded, though this is considered a likely artifact given the high-throughput nature of the screen.

== Clinical significance ==
MAGEB17 is classified as a cancer-testis antigen, with expression silenced in normal somatic tissues via DNA methylation and reactivated in a subset of tumors. RNA expression data indicate enrichment in colon, rectal, and liver adenocarcinomas, and testicular germ cell tumors. A stop-gain variant (V297*) has been identified, resulting in a truncated protein. By virtue of its tumor-specific expression, MAGEB17 represents a potential target for cancer immunotherapy.

Because of its tumor-associated expression pattern, MAGEB17 has been proposed as a potential target for cancer immunotherapy.

== Suggested reading ==
- Chomez P, et al. An Overview of the MAGE Gene Family with the Identification of All Human Members of the Family. Cancer Res. 2001.
