= Prame family member 10 =

Protein found in humans

PRAMEF10

Identifiers
- Aliases: PRAMEF10, PRAME family member 10
- External IDs: GeneCards: PRAMEF10

Gene location (Human)
| Chr. | Chromosome 1 (human) |
| Band | 1p36.21 | Start | 12,892,896 bp |
| Band | 1p36.21 | End | 12,898,270 bp |
RNA expression pattern
| Bgee | Human / Mouse (ortholog); Top expressed in: liver; right lobe of liver / n/a; More reference expression data |
| BioGPS | n/a |
Gene ontology
| Molecular function | retinoic acid receptor binding |
| Cellular component | cytoplasm |
| Biological process | negative regulation of cell differentiation; negative regulation of apoptotic process; negative regulation of transcription, DNA-templated; positive regulation of cell population proliferation |
Sources:Amigo / QuickGO
Orthologs
| Databases | NCBI: entry; OMA: entry |
| Species | Human | Mouse |
| Entrez | 343071 | n/a |
| Ensembl | ENSG00000282663; ENSG00000187545 | n/a |
| UniProt | O60809 | n/a |
| RefSeq (mRNA) | NM_001039361 | n/a |
| RefSeq (protein) | NP_001034450 | n/a |
| Location (UCSC) | Chr 1: 12.89 – 12.9 Mb | n/a |
| PubMed search | | n/a |
- Wikidata
| View/Edit Human |

PRAME family member 10 is a protein that in humans is encoded by the PRAMEF10 gene. Not much has been reported about this protein’s function, but it is predicted to be involved in ubiquitylation.

== See also ==
- PRAME
