= MAGEA10 =

Protein-coding gene in humans

Identifiers
- Aliases: MAGEA10, CT1.10, MAGE10, MAGE family member A10
- External IDs: OMIM: 300343; MGI: 3588211; GeneCards: MAGEA10

Gene location (Human)
Chr.	X chromosome (human)
Band	Xq28	Start	152,133,310 bp
Band	Xq28	End	152,138,578 bp

Gene location (Mouse)
Chr.	X chromosome (mouse)
Band	X|X A7.3	Start	71,425,476 bp
Band	X|X A7.3	End	71,430,464 bp
RNA expression pattern
Bgee	Human / Mouse (ortholog); Top expressed in: testicle; placenta; gonad; right testis; left testis; renal cortex; urinary bladder; vagina; ectocervix; gallbladder / Top expressed in: primary oocyte; zygote; secondary oocyte; blastocyst; spermatid; spermatocyte; testicle; More reference expression data
BioGPS	n/a
Orthologs
Databases	NCBI: entry; OMA: entry
Species	Human	Mouse
Entrez	4109	236852
Ensembl	ENSG00000124260	ENSMUSG00000043453
UniProt	P43363	A2AMW4
RefSeq (mRNA)	NM_021048; NM_001011543; NM_001251828	NM_001085506
RefSeq (protein)	NP_001011543; NP_001238757; NP_066386	NP_001078975
Location (UCSC)	Chr X: 152.13 – 152.14 Mb	Chr X: 71.43 – 71.43 Mb
PubMed search
- Wikidata
View/Edit Human	View/Edit Mouse

MAGEA10 (MAGE family member A10) is a protein-coding gene in humans clustered at chromosomal location Xq28.

== Function ==
This gene is a member of the MAGEA gene family. The members of this family encode proteins with 50 to 80% sequence identity to each other. The promoters and first exons of the MAGEA genes show considerable variability, suggesting that the existence of this gene family enables the same function to be expressed under different transcriptional controls.

The MAGEA genes are clustered at chromosomal location Xq28. They have been implicated in some hereditary disorders, such as dyskeratosis congenita. Alternative splicing results in multiple transcript variants. Read-through transcription also exists between this gene and the downstream melanoma antigen family A, 5 (MAGEA5) gene.
