= PRAME =

Identifiers
- Aliases: PRAME, CT130, MAPE, OIP-4, OIP4, preferentially expressed antigen in melanoma, PRAME nuclear receptor transcriptional regulator
- External IDs: OMIM: 606021; GeneCards: PRAME

Gene location (Human)
| Chr. | Chromosome 22 (human) |
| Band | 22q11.22 | Start | 22,547,701 bp |
| Band | 22q11.22 | End | 22,559,361 bp |
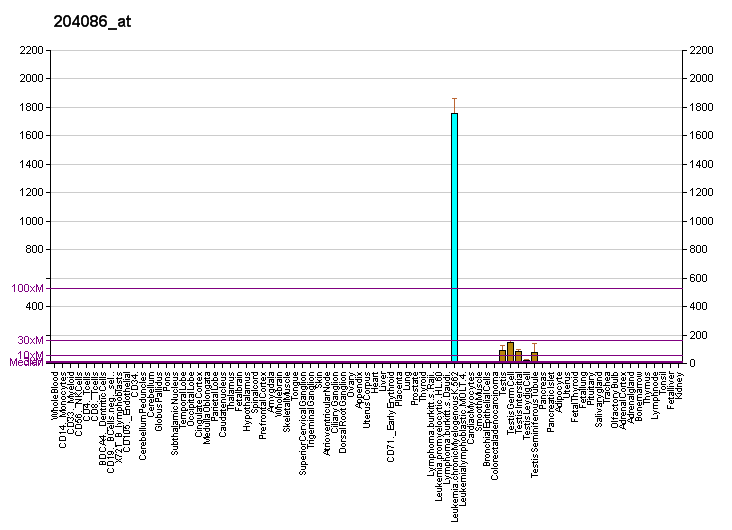
RNA expression pattern
| Bgee | Human / Mouse (ortholog); Top expressed in: right testis; left testis; testicle; gonad; endometrium; right adrenal cortex; left ovary; left adrenal gland; right ovary; left adrenal cortex / n/a; More reference expression data |
| BioGPS | More reference expression data |
Gene ontology
| Molecular function | protein binding; retinoic acid receptor binding |
| Cellular component | plasma membrane; nucleus; membrane; cytoplasm |
| Biological process | negative regulation of cell differentiation; regulation of growth; cell differentiation; negative regulation of apoptotic process; negative regulation of transcription, DNA-templated; regulation of transcription, DNA-templated; transcription, DNA-templated; positive regulation of cell population proliferation; apoptotic process; negative regulation of retinoic acid receptor signaling pathway |
Sources:Amigo / QuickGO
Orthologs
| Databases | NCBI: entry; OMA: entry |
| Species | Human | Mouse |
| Entrez | 23532 | n/a |
| Ensembl | ENSG00000185686; ENSG00000275013 | n/a |
| UniProt | P78395 | n/a |
| RefSeq (mRNA) | NM_001291715; NM_001291716; NM_001291717; NM_001291719; NM_006115 NM_206953; NM_206954; NM_206955; NM_206956; NM_001318126; NM_001318127 | n/a |
| RefSeq (protein) | NP_001278644; NP_001278645; NP_001278646; NP_001278648; NP_001305055 NP_001305056; NP_006106; NP_996836; NP_996837; NP_996838; NP_996839 | n/a |
| Location (UCSC) | Chr 22: 22.55 – 22.56 Mb | n/a |
| PubMed search | | n/a |
- Wikidata
| View/Edit Human |

PRAME (preferentially expressed antigen of melanoma) is a protein that in humans is encoded by the PRAME gene. Five alternatively spliced transcript variants encoding the same protein have been observed for this gene.

== Function ==
This gene encodes an antigen that is predominantly expressed in human melanomas and that is recognized by cytolytic T lymphocytes. It is not expressed in normal tissues, except testis. This expression pattern is similar to that of other CT antigens, such as MAGE, BAGE and GAGE. However, unlike these other CT antigens, this gene is also expressed in acute leukemias. The overexpression of PRAME in tumor tissues and relative low levels in normal somatic tissues make it an attractive target for cancer therapy. In recent years, immunotherapy has spearheaded a new era of cancer therapy resulting in the development of numerous novel antigen-specific immunotherapy approaches. Studies on PRAME-specific immunotherapy primarily involve vaccines and cellular immunotherapies.

PRAME can inhibit retinoic acid signaling and retinoic acid mediated differentiation and apoptosis. PRAME overexpression in triple negative breast cancer has also been found to promote cancer cell motility through induction of the epithelial-to-mesenchymal transition.
