= MAGEA5 =

Protein-coding gene in humans

MAGEA5P

Identifiers
- Aliases: MAGEA5P, CT1.5, MAGE5, MAGEA4, MAGE family member A5, MAGE family member A5, pseudogene, MAGEA5
- External IDs: OMIM: 300340; HomoloGene: 130448; GeneCards: MAGEA5P; OMA:MAGEA5P - orthologs
Gene ontology
Molecular function	molecular function
Cellular component	cellular component
Biological process	regulation of chromosome segregation
Sources:Amigo / QuickGO
Orthologs
Species	Human	Mouse
Entrez	4104	n/a
Ensembl	ENSG00000242520	n/a
UniProt	P43359	n/a
RefSeq (mRNA)	NM_021049	n/a
RefSeq (protein)	NP_066387	n/a
Location (UCSC)	n/a	n/a
PubMed search		n/a
- Wikidata
View/Edit Human

Melanoma antigen family A, 5 is a protein in humans that is encoded by the MAGEA5 gene.

This gene is a member of the MAGEA gene family. The members of this family encode proteins with 50 to 80% sequence identity to each other. The promoters and first exons of the MAGEA genes show considerable variability, suggesting that the existence of this gene family enables the same function to be expressed under different transcriptional controls. The MAGEA genes are clustered at chromosomal location Xq28. They have been implicated in some hereditary disorders, such as dyskeratosis congenita. This MAGEA gene encodes a protein that is C-terminally truncated compared to other family members, and this gene can be alternatively interpreted to be a pseudogene. The protein is represented in this Gene record in accordance with the assumed protein-coding status defined in the literature. Read-through transcription exists between this gene and the upstream melanoma antigen family A, 10 (MAGEA10) gene. [provided by RefSeq, Oct 2011].
