= Carbonic anhydrase 9 =

Enzyme found in humans

CA9
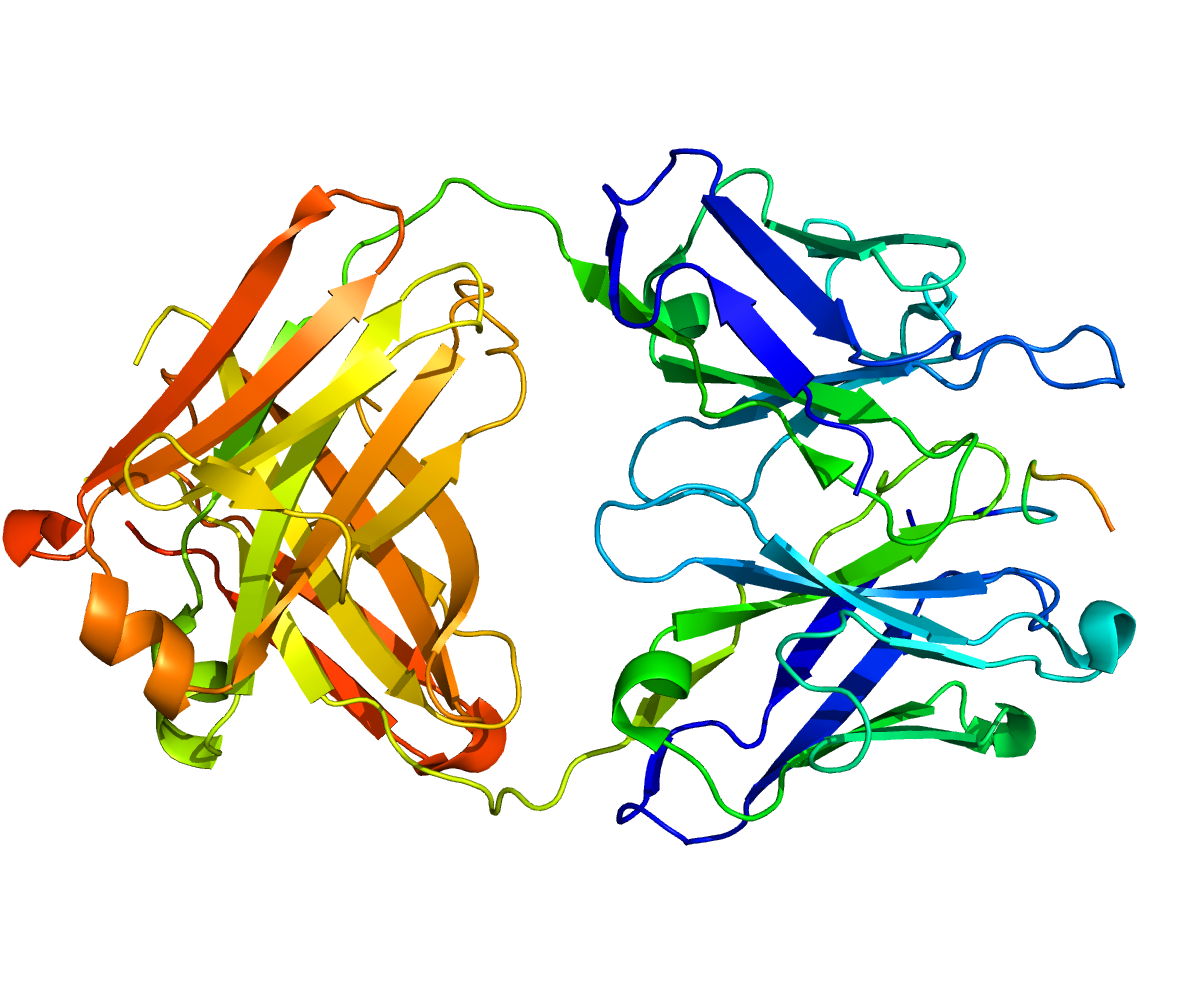

Identifiers
- Aliases: CA9, CAIX, MN, carbonic anhydrase 9
- External IDs: OMIM: 603179; MGI: 2447188; GeneCards: CA9
Available structures
PDB	Ortholog search: PDBe RCSB
PDB	List of PDB id codes 2HKF, 3IAI, 5FL4, 5FL5, 5FL6
Enzyme activity
EC #	BRENDA	ExPASy	KEGG	MetaCyc
4.2.1.1	↗	↗	↗	↗

Gene location (Human)
Chr.	Chromosome 9 (human)
Band	9p13.3	Start	35,673,928 bp
Band	9p13.3	End	35,681,159 bp

Gene location (Mouse)
Chr.	Chromosome 4 (mouse)
Band	4|4 A5	Start	43,506,966 bp
Band	4|4 A5	End	43,513,729 bp
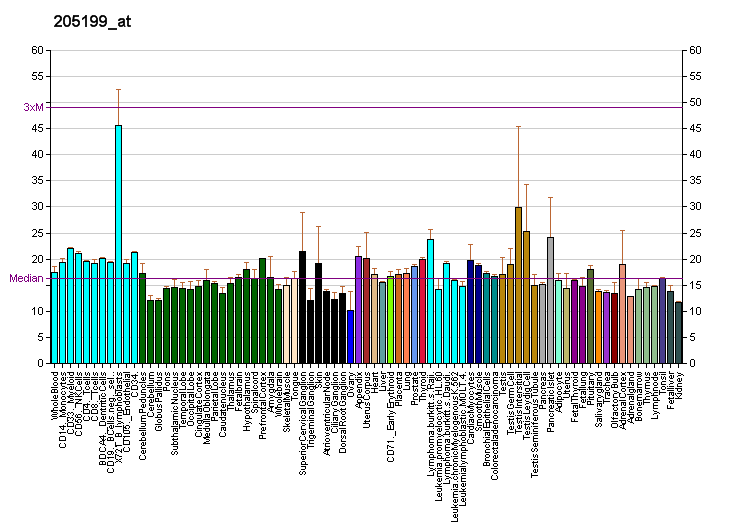
RNA expression pattern
Bgee	Human / Mouse (ortholog); Top expressed in: body of stomach; gallbladder; fundus; cardia; cerebellar hemisphere; gonad; right hemisphere of cerebellum; right testis; pylorus; left testis / Top expressed in: epithelium of stomach; mucous cell of stomach; zygote; pyloric antrum; primary oocyte; duodenum; secondary oocyte; large intestine; jejunum; colon; More reference expression data
BioGPS	More reference expression data
Gene ontology
Molecular function	metal ion binding; lyase activity; zinc ion binding; carbonate dehydratase activity; protein binding; carbonic anhydrase
Cellular component	nucleolus; cell projection; nucleus; membrane; basolateral plasma membrane; microvillus membrane; integral component of membrane; plasma membrane
Biological process	response to hypoxia; bicarbonate transport; morphogenesis of an epithelium; secretion; response to testosterone; regulation of transcription from RNA polymerase II promoter in response to hypoxia
Sources:Amigo / QuickGO
Orthologs
Databases	NCBI: entry; OMA: entry
Species	Human	Mouse
Entrez	768	230099
Ensembl	ENSG00000107159	ENSMUSG00000028463
UniProt	Q16790	Q8VHB5
RefSeq (mRNA)	NM_001216	NM_139305
RefSeq (protein)	NP_001207	NP_647466
Location (UCSC)	Chr 9: 35.67 – 35.68 Mb	Chr 4: 43.51 – 43.51 Mb
PubMed search
- Wikidata
View/Edit Human	View/Edit Mouse

Carbonic anhydrase IX (CA9/CA IX) is an enzyme that in humans is encoded by the CA9 gene. It is one of the 14 carbonic anhydrase isoforms found in humans and is a transmembrane dimeric metalloenzyme with an extracellular active site that facilitates acid secretion in the gastrointestinal tract. CA IX is overexpressed in many types of cancer including clear cell renal cell carcinoma (RCC) as well as carcinomas of the cervix, breast and lung where it promotes tumor growth by enhancing tumor acidosis.

== Structure ==
CA IX is a transmembrane glycoprotein with an extracellular active site. The cytoplasmic tail of the enzyme contains three residues that may be phosphorylated (Thr-443, Ser-448, and Tyr-449) and participate in signal transduction. Phosphorylated tyrosine 449 can interact with PI3K which activates protein kinase B to affect cellular glucose metabolism.

Under physiological conditions, the enzyme exists as two nearly identical dimers. Both dimers are stabilized by two hydrogen bonds between Arg-137 and the Ala-127 carbonyl oxygen as well as many Van der Waals interactions. One dimer, however, has additional stabilization due to a disulfide bridge formed by two cysteine residues.

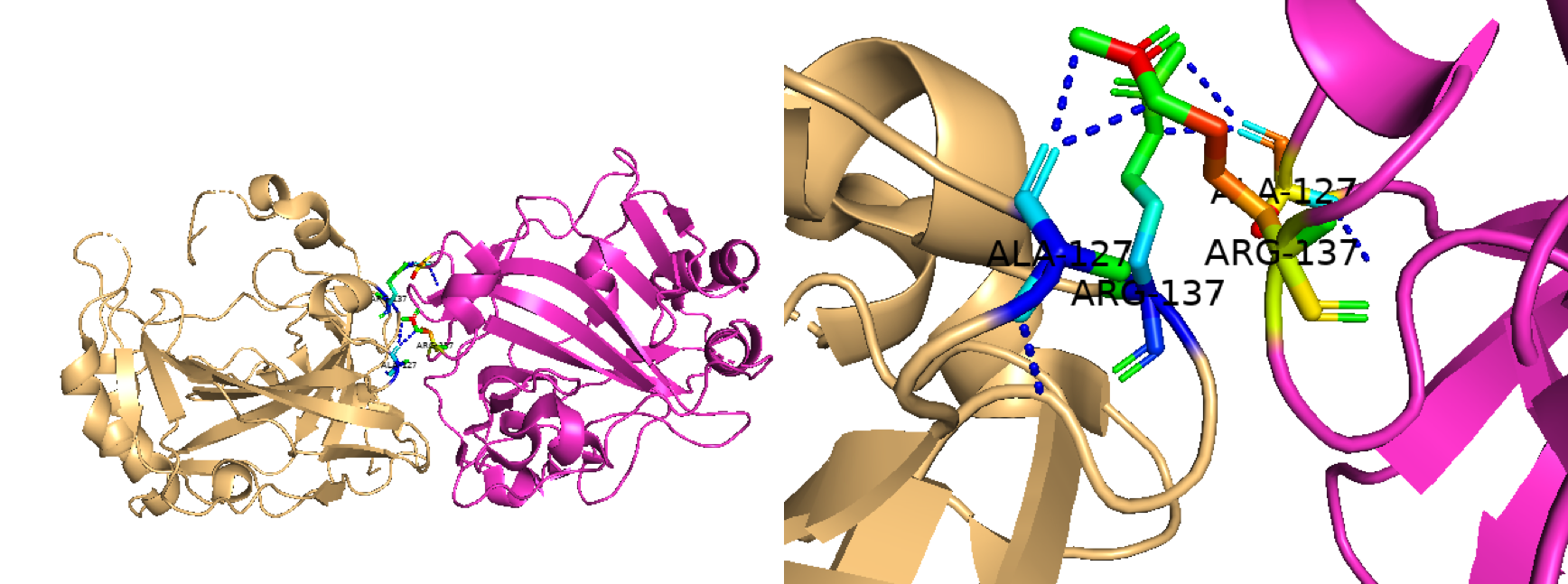
Two hydrogen bonds between Arg-137 and the Ala-127 carbonyl oxygen stabilize the CA IX dimer.

One face of the dimer contains proteoglycan (PG) domains-a feature that is unique from other CA enzymes- and the opposite face contains the C-termini which help the enzyme attach to the cell membrane. CA IX contains an N-linked glycosylation site bearing mannose-type glycan structures on Asn-309 as well as an O-linked glycosylation site on Thr-78.

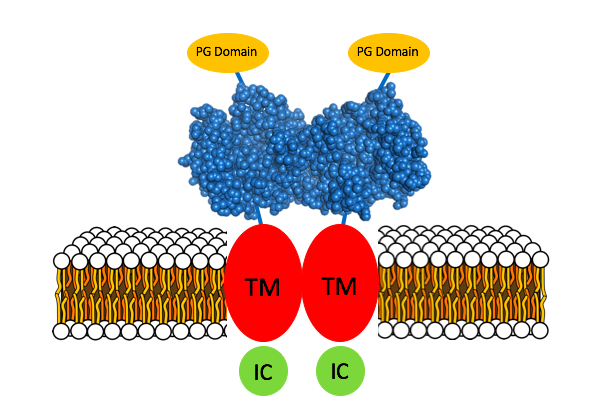
CA IX dimer with its four distinct pairs of domains labeled: the proteoglycan domain (PG), catalytic domain (blue), transmembrane segment (TM) and the intracellular tail (IC).

== Function ==
Carbonic anhydrases (CAs) are a large family of zinc metalloenzymes that catalyze the reversible hydration of carbon dioxide. They participate in a variety of biological processes, including respiration, calcification, acid-base balance, bone resorption, and the formation of aqueous humor, cerebrospinal fluid, saliva, and gastric acid. They show extensive diversity in tissue distribution and in their subcellular localization.

CA IX is mainly expressed in the gastrointestinal tract where it facilitates acid secretion. The CA IX enzyme, along with the CA II enzyme, binds to Anion Exchanger 2 (AE2) which increases bicarbonate transport and maximizes the rate of acid secretion by gastric parietal cells.

== Regulation ==
Expression of CA IX is primarily regulated at the transcriptional level. The promoter region of the CA9 gene contains an HRE (hypoxia responsive element) where HIF-1 can bind, which allows hypoxic conditions to increase CA IX expression. Expression can also be regulated post-translationally by metalloproteinases which cause shedding of the enzyme's ectodomain. Unlike other CA isozymes, CA IX is not inhibited by high lactate concentrations.

== Clinical significance ==
CA IX is a transmembrane protein and is a tumor-associated carbonic anhydrase isoenzyme. It is over-expressed in VHL mutated clear cell renal cell carcinoma (ccRCC) and hypoxic solid tumors, but is low-expressed in normal kidney and most other normal tissues. It may be involved in cell proliferation and transformation. This gene is mapped to 9p13-p12.

CA IX is a cellular biomarker of hypoxia. Furthermore, recent studies examining the association between CA IX levels and various clinicopathological outcomes suggest that CA IX expression may also be a valuable prognostic indicator for overall survival although this association has been questioned.

CA IX shows high expression in carcinomas of the uterine cervix, kidney, oesophagus, lung, breast, colon, brain, and vulva compared to expression in few noncancerous tissues. Its overexpression in cancerous tissues compared to normal ones is due to hypoxic conditions in the tumor microenvironment caused by abnormal vasculature and subsequent transcriptional activation by HIF-1 binding. In clear cell renal carcinomas, CA IX shows high expression under normoxia due to a mutation in the VHL gene that normally negatively regulates HIF-1. Because of its overexpression in many types of cancer and low expression in normal tissues, CAIX has become a useful target for clear cell RCC and breast cancer tumor imaging in mice.

CA IX plays a very significant role in tumor acidification as it has very high catalytic activity with the highest rate of proton transfer of the known CAs. The enzyme converts carbon dioxide outside of the tumor into bicarbonate and protons, contributing to extracellular acidosis and promoting tumor growth by regulating the pH of the cytosol.

== As a drug target ==
Because of its low expression in normal tissues and overexpression in many cancer tissues, CA IX has also become a desirable drug target. Girentuximab, an antibody that binds to CA IX, failed to improve disease-free as well as overall survival of patients with clear cell RCC in Phase III clinical trials.

However, a number of small molecules have been used to inhibit CA IX. The main classes of these inhibitors are inorganic anions, sulfonamides, phenols, and coumarins. Anions and sulfonamides inhibit CA IX by coordinating the zinc ion within CA IX while phenols bind to the zinc-coordinated water molecule. Coumarins serve as mechanism-based inhibitors that are hydrolyzed by the enzyme to form a cis-2-hydroxycinnamic acid derivative that then binds to the active site.
