= MAGEA3 =

Protein-coding gene in humans

Identifiers
- Aliases: MAGEA3, CT1.3, HIP8, HYPD, MAGE3, MAGEA6, MAGE family member A3
- External IDs: OMIM: 300174; GeneCards: MAGEA3
Available structures
PDB	Human UniProt search: PDBe RCSB
PDB	List of PDB id codes 4V0P, 5BRZ

Gene location (Human)
Chr.	X chromosome (human)
Band	Xq28	Start	152,698,767 bp
Band	Xq28	End	152,702,347 bp
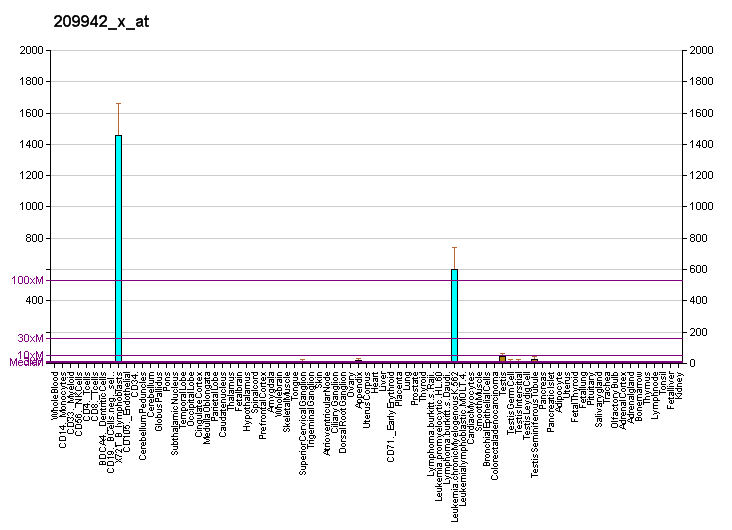

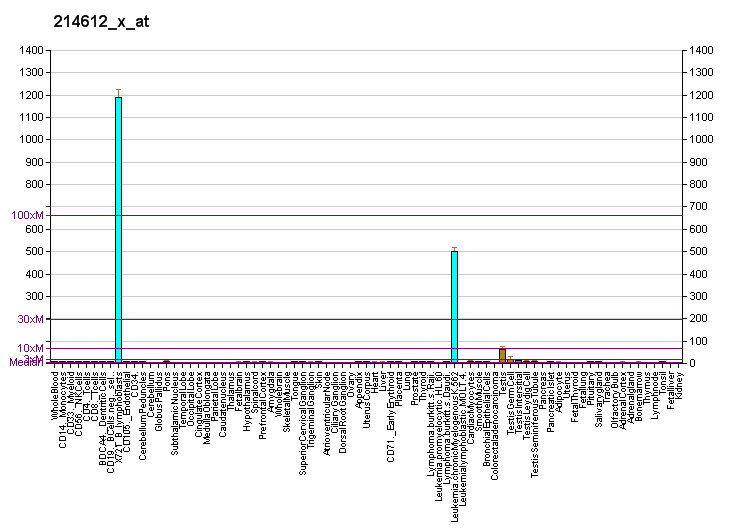
RNA expression pattern
Bgee	Human / Mouse (ortholog); Top expressed in: gonad; testicle; right testis; left testis; placenta; urinary bladder; human musculoskeletal system; renal cortex; skeletal muscle; gastrocnemius muscle / n/a; More reference expression data
BioGPS	More reference expression data
Gene ontology
Molecular function	caspase binding; protein binding
Cellular component	endoplasmic reticulum
Biological process	negative regulation of endoplasmic reticulum stress-induced intrinsic apoptotic signaling pathway; negative regulation of cysteine-type endopeptidase activity involved in apoptotic process; negative regulation of protein processing
Sources:Amigo / QuickGO
Orthologs
Databases	NCBI: entry; OMA: entry
Species	Human	Mouse
Entrez	4102	n/a
Ensembl	ENSG00000221867	n/a
UniProt	P43357	n/a
RefSeq (mRNA)	NM_005362	n/a
RefSeq (protein)	NP_005353	n/a
Location (UCSC)	Chr X: 152.7 – 152.7 Mb	n/a
PubMed search		n/a
- Wikidata
View/Edit Human

Melanoma-associated antigen 3 (MAGE-A3) is a protein that in humans is encoded by the MAGEA3 gene.

== Genetics ==
This gene is a member of the melanoma-associated antigen gene family. The members of this family encode proteins with 50 to 80% sequence identity to each other. The promoters and first exons of the MAGEA genes show considerable variability, suggesting that the existence of this gene family enables the same function to be expressed under different transcriptional controls. The MAGEA genes are clustered at chromosomal location Xq28. They have been implicated in some hereditary disorders, such as dyskeratosis congenita.

== Function and Clinical relevance ==
The normal function of MAGE-A3 in healthy cells is unknown. The presence of the antigen on tumor cells has been associated with worse prognosis. In one study, high levels of MAGE-A3 in lung adenocarcinoma were associated with shorter survival.

MAGE-A3 is a tumor-specific protein, and has been identified on many tumors including melanoma, non-small cell lung cancer, hematologic malignancies, among others. Currently, GlaxoSmithKline is developing a cancer vaccine targeting MAGE-A3. The vaccine is a fusion protein of MAGE-A3 and Haemophilus influenzae protein D, combined with a proprietary immunoadjuvant.
