= Cancer/testis antigen 83 =

Mammalian protein found in humans

CT83

Identifiers
- Aliases: CT83, CXorf61, KK-LC-1, KKLC1, cancer/testis antigen 83
- External IDs: OMIM: 300625; HomoloGene: 128483; GeneCards: CT83; OMA:CT83 - orthologs

Gene location (Human)
| Chr. | X chromosome (human) |
| Band | Xq23 | Start | 116,461,686 bp |
| Band | Xq23 | End | 116,462,976 bp |
RNA expression pattern
| Bgee | Human / Mouse (ortholog); Top expressed in: sperm; right testis; left testis; gastric mucosa; gonad; minor salivary glands; face; sensory nervous system; sensory organ; mammary gland / n/a; More reference expression data |
| BioGPS | n/a |
Orthologs
| Species | Human | Mouse |
| Entrez | 203413 | n/a |
| Ensembl | ENSG00000204019 | n/a |
| UniProt | Q5H943 | n/a |
| RefSeq (mRNA) | NM_001017978 | n/a |
| RefSeq (protein) | NP_001017978 | n/a |
| Location (UCSC) | Chr X: 116.46 – 116.46 Mb | n/a |
| PubMed search | | n/a |
- Wikidata
| View/Edit Human |

Cancer/testis antigen 83 is a protein that in humans is encoded by the CT83 gene.
