= MAGEA12 =

Protein-coding gene in humans

Identifiers
- Aliases: MAGEA12, CT1.12, MAGE12, MAGE family member A12
- External IDs: OMIM: 300177; GeneCards: MAGEA12

Gene location (Human)
Chr.	X chromosome (human)
Band	Xq28	Start	152,733,757 bp
Band	Xq28	End	152,737,669 bp
RNA expression pattern
Bgee	Human / Mouse (ortholog); Top expressed in: gonad; testicle; right testis; left testis; putamen; prefrontal cortex; amygdala; caudate nucleus; cingulate gyrus; anterior cingulate cortex / n/a; More reference expression data
BioGPS	n/a
Gene ontology
Molecular function	protein binding; molecular function
Cellular component	cellular component
Biological process	biological process
Sources:Amigo / QuickGO
Orthologs
Databases	NCBI: entry; OMA: entry
Species	Human	Mouse
Entrez	4111	n/a
Ensembl	ENSG00000213401	n/a
UniProt	P43365	n/a
RefSeq (mRNA)	NM_005367; NM_001166386; NM_001166387	n/a
RefSeq (protein)	NP_001159858; NP_001159859; NP_005358	n/a
Location (UCSC)	Chr X: 152.73 – 152.74 Mb	n/a
PubMed search		n/a
- Wikidata
View/Edit Human

Melanoma-associated antigen 12 is a protein that in humans is encoded by the MAGEA12 gene.

== Function ==
This gene is a member of the MAGEA gene family. The members of this family encode proteins with 50 to 80% sequence identity to each other. The promoters and first exons of the MAGEA genes show considerable variability, suggesting that the existence of this gene family enables the same function to be expressed under different transcriptional controls. The MAGEA genes are clustered at chromosomal location Xq28. They have been implicated in some hereditary disorders, such as dyskeratosis congenita.
