= MAGEB2 =

Protein-coding gene in humans

Identifiers
- Aliases: MAGEB2, CT3.2, DAM6, MAGE-XP-2, MAGE family member B2
- External IDs: OMIM: 300098; MGI: 2148568; GeneCards: MAGEB2

Gene location (Human)
| Chr. | X chromosome (human) |
| Band | Xp21.2 | Start | 30,215,563 bp |
| Band | Xp21.2 | End | 30,220,089 bp |

Gene location (Mouse)
| Chr. | X chromosome (mouse) |
| Band | X|X C1 | Start | 85,293,860 bp |
| Band | X|X C1 | End | 85,348,699 bp |
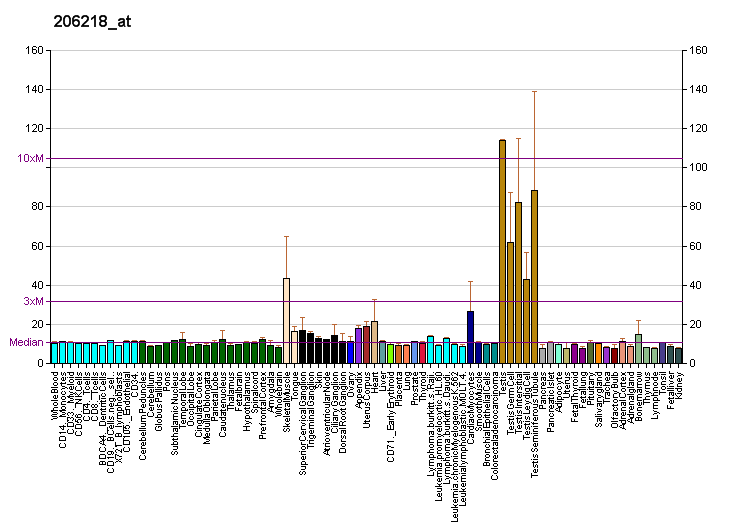
RNA expression pattern
| Bgee | Human / Mouse (ortholog); Top expressed in: testicle; gonad; right testis; left testis; pancreatic ductal cell; skin of hip; optic nerve; skin of thigh; lower lobe of lung; placenta / Top expressed in: embryo; morula; embryo; spermatid; spermatocyte; testicle; epiblast; More reference expression data |
| BioGPS | More reference expression data |
Orthologs
| Databases | NCBI: entry; OMA: entry |
| Species | Human | Mouse |
| Entrez | 4113 | 434903 |
| Ensembl | ENSG00000099399 | ENSMUSG00000035427 |
| UniProt | O15479 | A2A9R3 |
| RefSeq (mRNA) | NM_002364 | NM_001033492 |
| RefSeq (protein) | NP_002355 | NP_001028664 |
| Location (UCSC) | Chr X: 30.22 – 30.22 Mb | Chr X: 85.29 – 85.35 Mb |
| PubMed search |
- Wikidata
| View/Edit Human | View/Edit Mouse |

Melanoma-associated antigen B2 is a protein that in humans is encoded by the MAGEB2 gene.

This gene is a member of the MAGEB gene family. The members of this family have their entire coding sequences located in the last exon, and the encoded proteins show 50 to 68% sequence identity to each other. The promoters and first exons of the MAGEB genes show considerable variability, suggesting that the existence of this gene family enables the same function to be expressed under different transcriptional controls. This gene is localized in the DSS (dosage-sensitive sex reversal) critical region. It is expressed in testis and placenta, and in a significant fraction of tumors of various histological types. The MAGEB genes are clustered on chromosome Xp22-p21.
