= Girentuximab =

Monoclonal antibody

Monoclonal antibody
- Type: Whole antibody
- Source: Chimeric
- Target: CA-IX

Clinical data
- Trade names: Rencarex
- ATC code: none

Identifiers
- CAS Number: 916138-87-9
- ChemSpider: none
- UNII: 539B57DFJF

Chemical and physical data
- Formula: C_{6460}H_{10006}N_{1718}O_{2018}S_{48}
- Molar mass: 145566.00 g·mol^{−1}

Girentuximab (trade name Rencarex) is a chimeric IgG1 monoclonal antibody to carbonic anhydrase IX (CAIX). CAIX is expressed on the surface of most renal cancer cells and is hypothesized to be on the surface of other tumor cells. It is investigational agent in clinical trials for renal cell carcinoma. Its development was suspended as a "naked" or unconjugated antibody during phase III trials due to efficacy.

Girentuximab was originally developed by Wilex AG, Germany. It was granted fast track status and orphan drug designation by the FDA for renal cancer. In January 2017, Telix Pharmaceuticals Limited, an Australian biotechnology company, announced that it had in-licensed Girentuximab for use as a radioimmunoconjugate.

It triggers antibody-dependent cell-mediated cytotoxicity (ADCC). When it binds to its antigen (carbonic anhydrase IX), it activates natural killer cells by binding to a receptor on the NK cells.
