= MAGEC2 =

Protein-coding gene in humans

Identifiers
- Aliases: MAGEC2, CT10, HCA587, MAGEE1, MAGE family member C2
- External IDs: OMIM: 300468; GeneCards: MAGEC2

Gene location (Human)
Chr.	X chromosome (human)
Band	Xq27.2	Start	142,202,342 bp
Band	Xq27.2	End	142,205,290 bp
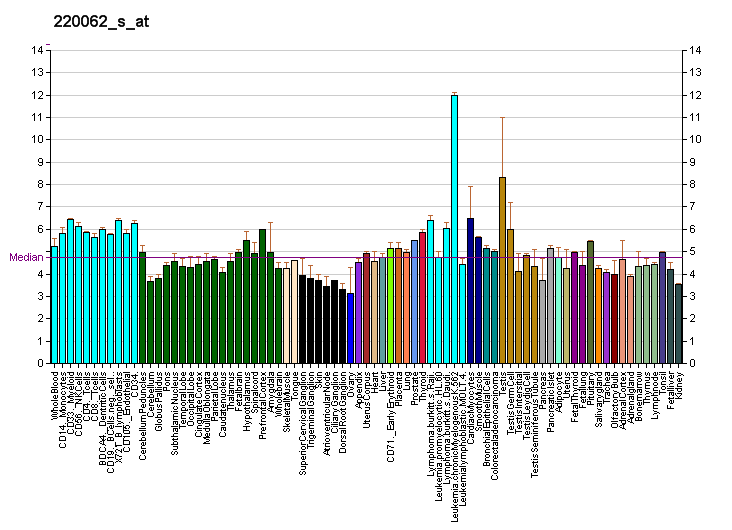
RNA expression pattern
Bgee	Human / Mouse (ortholog); Top expressed in: testicle; gonad; right testis; left testis; renal cortex; human musculoskeletal system; muscular system; muscle; muscle; skeletal muscle / n/a; More reference expression data
BioGPS	More reference expression data
Gene ontology
Molecular function	protein binding; ubiquitin protein ligase binding
Cellular component	nucleus; cytoplasm; nucleolus; cytosol
Biological process	positive regulation of ubiquitin-protein transferase activity
Sources:Amigo / QuickGO
Orthologs
Databases	NCBI: entry; OMA: entry
Species	Human	Mouse
Entrez	51438	n/a
Ensembl	ENSG00000046774	n/a
UniProt	Q9UBF1	n/a
RefSeq (mRNA)	NM_016249	n/a
RefSeq (protein)	NP_057333	n/a
Location (UCSC)	Chr X: 142.2 – 142.21 Mb	n/a
PubMed search		n/a
- Wikidata
View/Edit Human

Melanoma-associated antigen C2 is a protein that in humans is encoded by the MAGEC2 gene.

This gene is related to members of the MAGEC gene family. It is not expressed in normal tissues, except for testis, and is expressed in tumors of various histological types. This gene and the MAGEC genes are clustered on chromosome Xq26-q27.
