= MAGED2 =

Protein-coding gene in humans

Identifiers
- Aliases: MAGED2, 11B6, BCG-1, BCG1, HCA10, MAGE-D2, MAGE family member D2, BARTS5
- External IDs: OMIM: 300470; MGI: 1933391; GeneCards: MAGED2

Gene location (Human)
Chr.	X chromosome (human)
Band	Xp11.21	Start	54,807,599 bp
Band	Xp11.21	End	54,816,015 bp

Gene location (Mouse)
Chr.	X chromosome (mouse)
Band	X|X F3	Start	149,589,366 bp
Band	X|X F3	End	149,597,341 bp
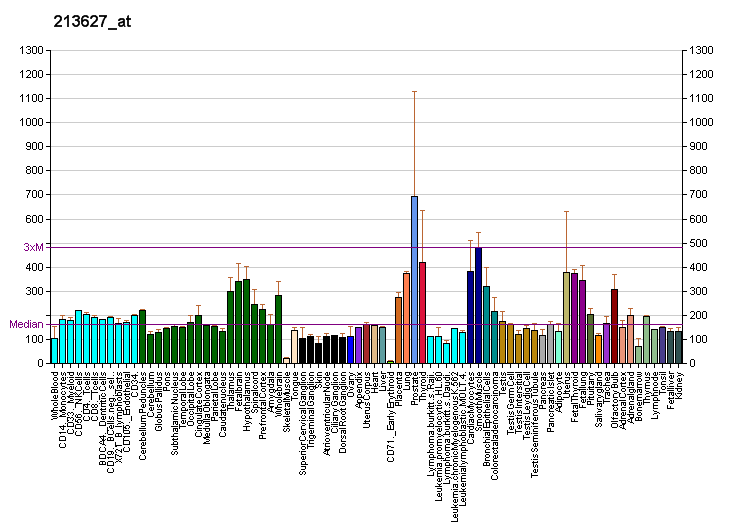

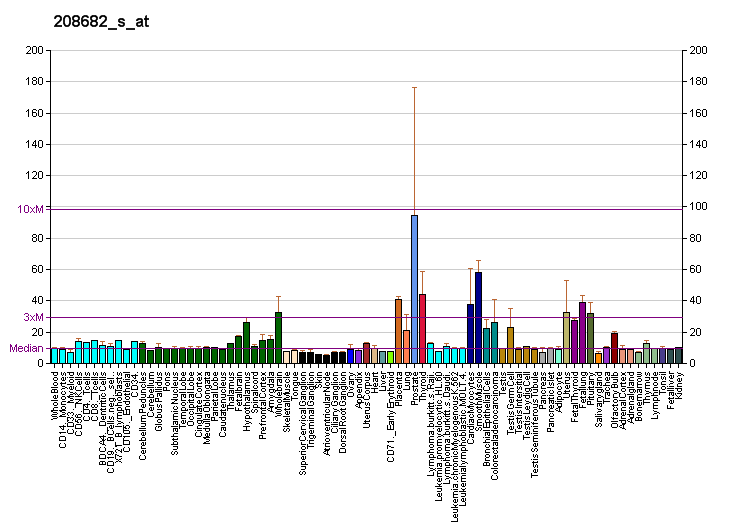
RNA expression pattern
Bgee	Human / Mouse (ortholog); Top expressed in: anterior pituitary; left ovary; right ovary; ganglionic eminence; right uterine tube; stromal cell of endometrium; Descending thoracic aorta; canal of the cervix; popliteal artery; tibial arteries / Top expressed in: neural tube; placenta; mesencephalon; lens; genital tubercle; ovary; tail of embryo; adrenal gland; yolk sac; uterus; More reference expression data
BioGPS	More reference expression data
Gene ontology
Molecular function	protein binding
Cellular component	membrane; extracellular region; nucleus; nucleolus; cytosol; platelet alpha granule lumen
Biological process	platelet degranulation; female pregnancy; renal sodium ion absorption
Sources:Amigo / QuickGO
Orthologs
Databases	NCBI: entry; OMA: entry
Species	Human	Mouse
Entrez	10916	80884
Ensembl	ENSG00000102316	ENSMUSG00000025268
UniProt	Q9UNF1	n/a
RefSeq (mRNA)	NM_201222; NM_014599; NM_177433	NM_001199246; NM_030700; NM_001358566; NM_001358567; NM_001358568
RefSeq (protein)	NP_055414; NP_803182; NP_957516; NP_055414.2; NP_803182.1 NP_957516.1	n/a
Location (UCSC)	Chr X: 54.81 – 54.82 Mb	Chr X: 149.59 – 149.6 Mb
PubMed search
- Wikidata
View/Edit Human	View/Edit Mouse

Melanoma-associated antigen D2 is a protein that in humans is encoded by the MAGED2 gene.

This gene is a member of the MAGED gene family. While the MAGEA and MAGEB genes are silent in normal tissues with the exception of testis and placenta, the MAGED genes are expressed ubiquitously. The MAGED genes are clustered on chromosome Xp11. This gene is located in Xp11.2, a hot spot for X-linked mental retardation (XLMR). Multiple alternatively spliced transcript variants have been found for this gene, however, the full length nature of some variants has not been defined.
