= MAGED4 =

Protein-coding gene in humans

Identifiers
- Aliases: MAGED4, MAGE-E1, MAGE1, MAGEE1, MAGE family member D4, MAGE-D4
- External IDs: OMIM: 300702; GeneCards: MAGED4

Gene location (Human)
Chr.	X chromosome (human)
Band	Xp11.22	Start	52,184,876 bp
Band	Xp11.22	End	52,192,268 bp
RNA expression pattern
Bgee	Human / Mouse (ortholog); Top expressed in: ganglionic eminence; ventricular zone; stromal cell of endometrium; hypothalamus; pituitary gland; anterior pituitary; amygdala; nucleus accumbens; C1 segment; hippocampus proper / n/a; More reference expression data
BioGPS	n/a
Orthologs
Databases	NCBI: entry; OMA: entry
Species	Human	Mouse
Entrez	728239	n/a
Ensembl	ENSG00000154545	n/a
UniProt	Q96JG8	n/a
RefSeq (mRNA)	NM_001272063; NM_001098800; NM_001272061; NM_001272062	n/a
RefSeq (protein)	NP_001092270; NP_001258990; NP_001258991; NP_001258992	n/a
Location (UCSC)	Chr X: 52.18 – 52.19 Mb	n/a
PubMed search		n/a
- Wikidata
View/Edit Human

MAGE family member D4 is a protein that in humans is encoded by the MAGED4 gene.
