= Melanoma antigen family A, 8 =

Protein-coding gene in the species Homo sapiens

MAGEA8

Identifiers
- Aliases: MAGEA8, CT1.8, MAGE8, Melanoma antigen family a, 8, MAGE family member A8
- External IDs: OMIM: 300341; GeneCards: MAGEA8

Gene location (Human)
Chr.	X chromosome (human)
Band	Xq28	Start	149,881,141 bp
Band	Xq28	End	149,885,835 bp
RNA expression pattern
Bgee	Human / Mouse (ortholog); Top expressed in: placenta; gonad; right testis; left testis; gastric mucosa; right hemisphere of cerebellum; cervix; body of uterus; muscle of thigh; canal of the cervix / n/a; More reference expression data
BioGPS	n/a
Gene ontology
Molecular function	protein binding; molecular function
Cellular component	cellular component
Biological process	biological process
Sources:Amigo / QuickGO
Orthologs
Databases	NCBI: entry; OMA: entry
Species	Human	Mouse
Entrez	4107	n/a
Ensembl	ENSG00000156009	n/a
UniProt	P43361	n/a
RefSeq (mRNA)	NM_005364; NM_001166400; NM_001166401	n/a
RefSeq (protein)	NP_001159872; NP_001159873; NP_005355	n/a
Location (UCSC)	Chr X: 149.88 – 149.89 Mb	n/a
PubMed search		n/a
- Wikidata
View/Edit Human

Melanoma antigen family A, 8 is a protein that in humans is encoded by the MAGEA8 gene.

== Function ==
This gene is a member of the MAGEA gene family. The members of this family encode proteins with 50 to 80% sequence identity to each other. The promoters and first exons of the MAGEA genes show considerable variability, suggesting that the existence of this gene family enables the same function to be expressed under different transcriptional controls. The MAGEA genes are clustered at chromosomal location Xq28. They have been implicated in some hereditary disorders, such as dyskeratosis congenita. Multiple alternatively spliced variants, encoding the same protein, have been identified.
