= CTAG1B =

Protein-coding gene in humans

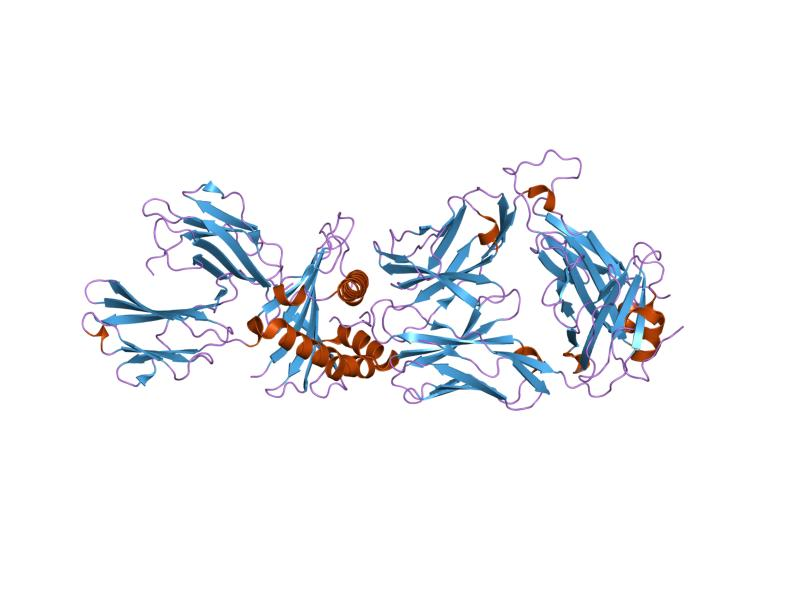

Identifiers
- Aliases: CTAG1B, CT6.1, CTAG, CTAG1, ESO1, LAGE-2, LAGE2B, NY-ESO-1, cancer/testis antigen 1B
- External IDs: OMIM: 300156; GeneCards: CTAG1B
Available structures
| PDB | Human UniProt search: PDBe RCSB |
| PDB | List of PDB id codes 1S9W, 2BNQ, 2BNR, 2F53, 2F54, 2P5E, 2P5W, 2PYE, 3GJF, 3HAE, 3KLA |

Gene location (Human)
| Chr. | X chromosome (human) |
| Band | Xq28 | Start | 154,617,609 bp |
| Band | Xq28 | End | 154,619,282 bp |
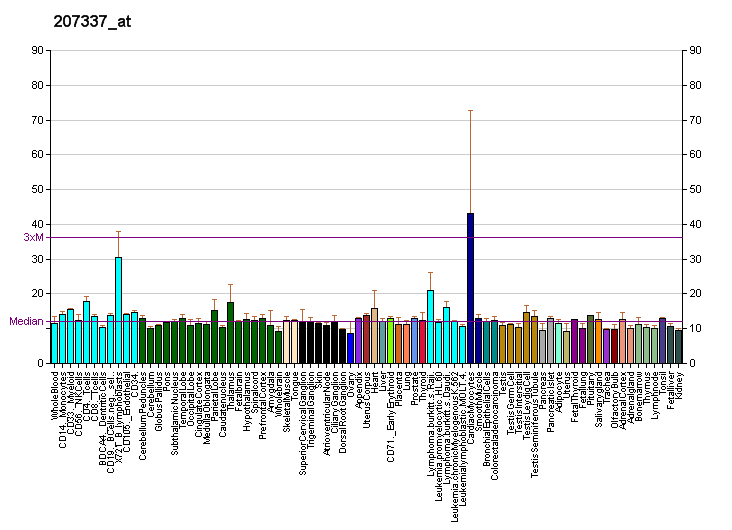

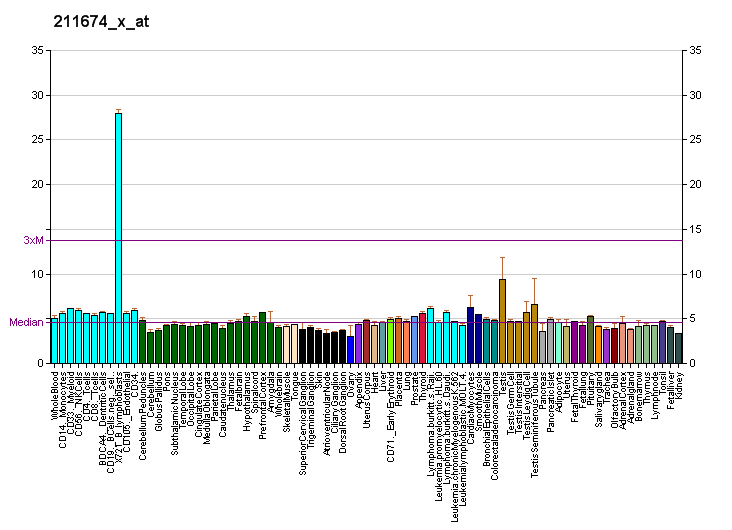

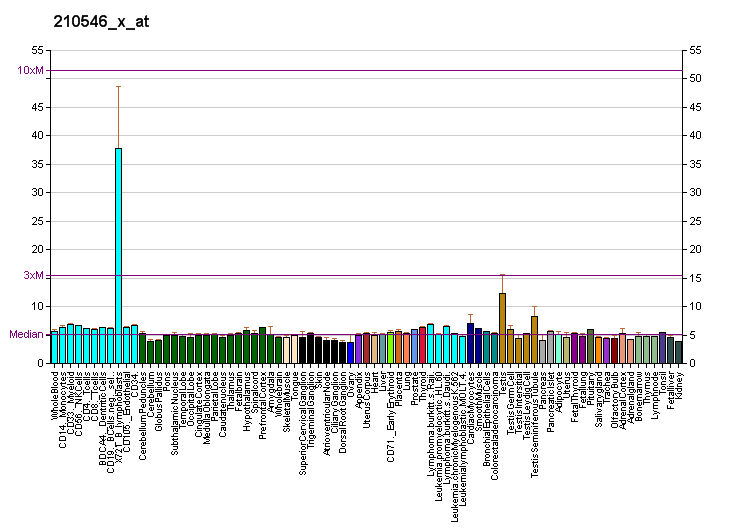
RNA expression pattern
| Bgee | Human / Mouse (ortholog); Top expressed in: gonad; testicle; left testis; right testis; stromal cell of endometrium; muscle of thigh; ectocervix; primary visual cortex; skeletal muscle tissue; lactiferous gland / n/a; More reference expression data |
| BioGPS | More reference expression data |
Orthologs
| Databases | NCBI: entry; OMA: entry |
| Species | Human | Mouse |
| Entrez | 1485 | n/a |
| Ensembl | ENSG00000184033 | n/a |
| UniProt | P78358 | n/a |
| RefSeq (mRNA) | NM_001327 | n/a |
| RefSeq (protein) | NP_640343; NP_001318 | n/a |
| Location (UCSC) | Chr X: 154.62 – 154.62 Mb | n/a |
| PubMed search | | n/a |
- Wikidata
| View/Edit Human |

Cancer/testis antigen 1 also known as LAGE2 or LAGE2B is a protein that in humans is encoded by the CTAG1B gene. It is most often referenced by its alias NY-ESO-1.

Cancer/Testis Antigen 1B is a protein belonging to the family of Cancer Testis Antigens (CTA) that are expressed in a variety of malignant tumours at the mRNA and protein levels, but also restricted to testicular germ cells in normal adult tissues. A clone of CTAG gene was originally identified by immunological methods in oesophageal carcinoma using patient serum. The aberrant re-expression of CTAs is induced by molecular mechanisms including DNA demethylation, histone post-translational modification, and microRNA-mediated regulation. The effect of DNA demethylation is evident by the capability of demethylating agents, such as 5-aza-2-deoxycytidine, to induce CTAs re-expression in tumour cells but not in normal epithelial cells.

== Gene ==
CTAG1B is located on the long arm of chromosome X (Xq28), containing three exons that are approximately 8 Kb in length. CTAG1B is found to have a neighbouring gene of identical sequence: CTAG1A.

== Protein ==
The gene encodes a 180-amino acid polypeptide, expressed from 18 weeks during embryonic development until birth in human fetal testis. It is also strongly expressed in spermatogonia and in primary spermatocytes of adult testis, but not in post-meiotic cells or testicular somatic cells. Structurally, CTAG1B features a glycine-rich N-terminal region, as well as a hydrophobic C-terminal region with a Pcc-1 domain. The protein has been shown to be homologous to two other CTAs located in the same region: LAGE-1 and ESO3. The exact function of CTAG1B remains to be unknown. Studies have suggested its role in cell cycle progression and growth, although not being elusive, through the analysis of CTAG1B's structure and expression pattern. The coexpression of CTAG1B with melanoma antigen gene C1 (MAGE-C1), another CTA, further supports its involvement in cell cycle regulation and apoptosis, due to the role of MAGE proteins in these processes. Moreover, its restricted expression pattern in male germ cells suggests its role in germ cell self-renewal or differentiation, supported by the nuclear localization of CTAG1B in mesenchymal stem cells in contrast to its cytoplasmic expression in cancer cells.

== Humoral Immune Response ==
It is also believed that cancer-testis antigens are immunogenic proteins, since many members of the family have been shown to induce spontaneous cellular and humoral immune responses in patients with advanced stage tumours. The first reported simultaneous humoral and cellular response against CTAG1B was from a metastatic melanoma patient. 3 HLA-A2 restricted epitopes in CTAG1B were identified as the recognition sites for CD8+ cytotoxic T lymphocytes. Integrated humoral immune responses against CTAG1B have been detected in patients with: Multiple myeloma, breast cancer, non small-cell lung carcinoma, and ovarian cancer. As such, CTAG1B is believed to be a promising candidate for cancer immunotherapy due to its exclusive expression in normal tissues and re expression in tumour cells, as well as its high immunogenicity. These features also suggest a limited off-target toxicity of CTAG1B-based cancer therapies. The immunisation with CTAG1B could be a successful approach to induce antigen specific immune responses in cancer patients. Up until May 2018, there have been 12 clinical trials registered using a CTAG1B cancer vaccine, 23 using modified T cells, and 13 using combinatorial immunotherapy.

Examining the expression of a number of CTA genes in 23 samples of sporadic medullary thyroid carcinoma has revealed that CTAG1B expression significantly correlates with tumour recurrence. A humoral response against this CTA was detected in 54.5% of CTAG1B-expressing patients, and in 1 of 6 patients with an CTAG1B-negative tumour. Anti-CTAG1B antibodies were present in 35.7%, demonstrating that medullary thyroid carcinoma is associated with humoral immune response to CTAG1B. Another study has shown that CTAG1B binding to CALR on macrophages and dendritic cells provides a link between CTAG1B, the innate immune system, and possibly the adaptive immune response against CTAG1B.
