= MAGEA1 =

Mammalian protein found in humans

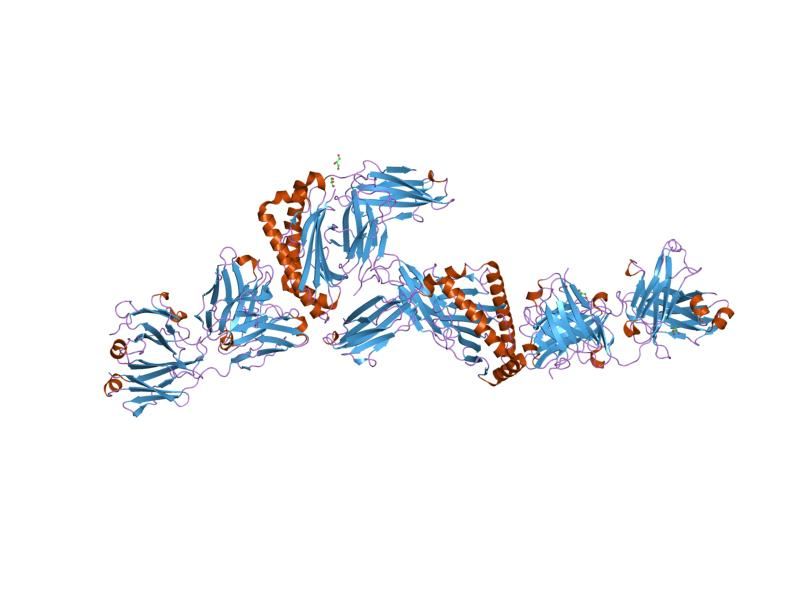

Identifiers
- Aliases: MAGEA1, CT1.1, MAGE1, MAGE family member A1
- External IDs: OMIM: 300016; GeneCards: MAGEA1
Available structures
PDB	Human UniProt search: PDBe RCSB
PDB	List of PDB id codes 1W72, 3BO8

Gene location (Human)
Chr.	X chromosome (human)
Band	Xq28	Start	153,179,284 bp
Band	Xq28	End	153,183,880 bp
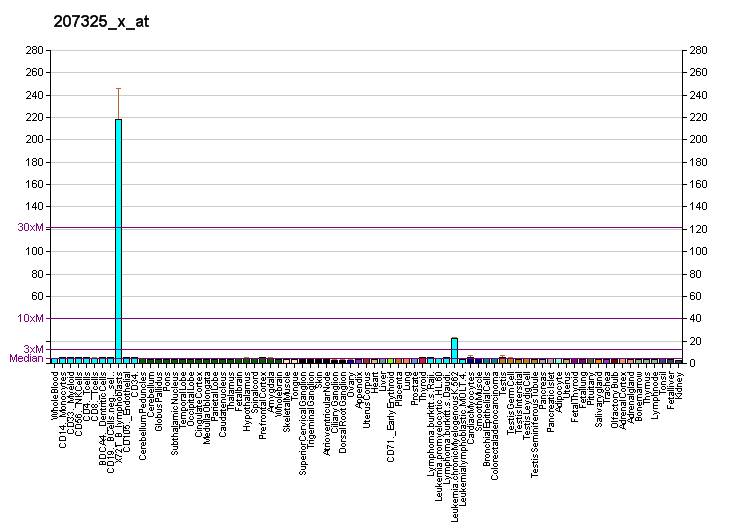

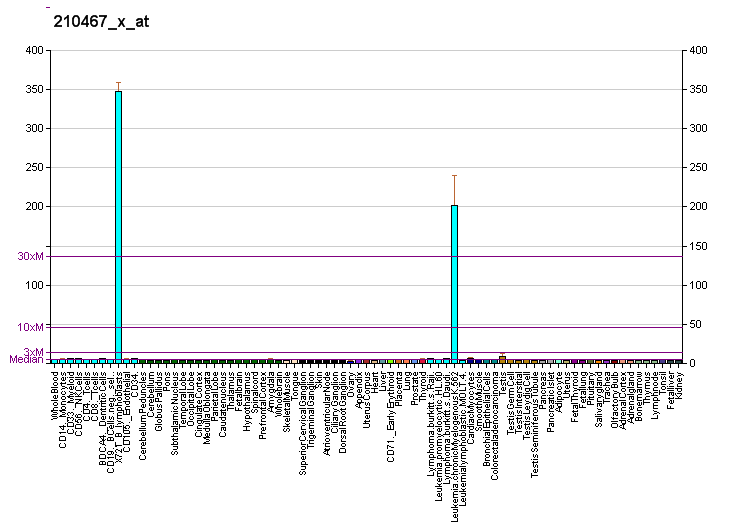
RNA expression pattern
Bgee	Human / Mouse (ortholog); Top expressed in: gonad; testicle; right testis; left testis; urinary bladder; human musculoskeletal system; kidney; muscular system; muscle; renal cortex / n/a; More reference expression data
BioGPS	More reference expression data
Gene ontology
Molecular function	histone deacetylase binding; protein binding
Cellular component	cytoplasm; plasma membrane; nucleus
Biological process	regulation of transcription, DNA-templated; negative regulation of transcription by RNA polymerase II; transcription, DNA-templated; negative regulation of Notch signaling pathway
Sources:Amigo / QuickGO
Orthologs
Databases	NCBI: entry; OMA: entry
Species	Human	Mouse
Entrez	4100	n/a
Ensembl	ENSG00000198681	n/a
UniProt	P43355	n/a
RefSeq (mRNA)	NM_004988	n/a
RefSeq (protein)	NP_004979	n/a
Location (UCSC)	Chr X: 153.18 – 153.18 Mb	n/a
PubMed search		n/a
- Wikidata
View/Edit Human

Melanoma-associated antigen 1 is a protein that in humans is encoded by the MAGEA1 gene.

This gene is a member of the MAGEA gene family. The members of this family encode proteins with 50 to 80% sequence identity to each other. The promoters and first exons of the MAGEA genes show considerable variability, suggesting that the existence of this gene family enables the same function to be expressed under different transcriptional controls. The MAGEA genes are clustered at chromosomal location Xq28. They have been implicated in some hereditary disorders, such as dyskeratosis congenita.
