= Kagami–Ogata syndrome =

- Other names: KOS
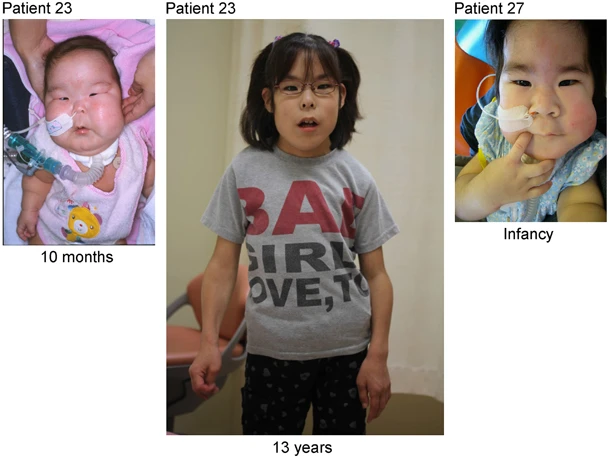
- A photo showing two patients who have Kagami–Ogata syndrome. Note: Prominent Philtrum, Full cheeks, Pursed Lips.
- Specialty: Medical Genetics

Kagami–Ogata syndrome is a rare genetic disease that is caused by mutations on maternal chromosome 14 or by paternal UPD(14). The main signs of this disease are: polyhydramnios, narrow bell-shaped thorax, coat-hanger-like ribs, abdominal wall defect, enlarged placenta. Patients with KOS also have a facial dysmorphism, such as: frontal bossing, excessive hair growth on forehead, depressed nasal bridge, micrognathia with/or retrognathia, full cheeks, webbed neck, protruding philtrum.

== Symptoms ==
The symptoms of this disease are:

Very frequent:

- Anteverted nares
- Bell-shapes thorax
- Protruding philtrum
- Coat hanger-like ribs
- Depressed nasal bridge
- Dysphagia
- Full cheeks
- Intellectual disability
- Enlarged placenta
- Joint mobility limitation
- Micrognathia
- Webbed and short neck
- Respiratory failure
- Polyhydroamnios

Frequent:

- Puckered lips
- Coxa valga
- Small eye openings
- Frontal bossing and hirsutism
- Premature birth
- Omphalocele
- Kyphoscoliosis

Occasional:

- Anomalies of the cardiovascular system
- Hepatoblastoma
- Overgrowth
- Postnatal growth retardation

Very rare:

- Seizures

== Cause ==
There are three main mechanisms that can cause KOS:

1. Paternal Unipaternal Disomy (in 55–70% cases). This can be caused by monosomy rescue. Usually Paternal UPD arises from nondisjunction in oocyte which causes nullisomy of that chromosome. When such oocyte gets fertilised, conceptus will have 1 chromosome (in that case only one chromosome 14) and autosomal monosomy is fatal most of the times. In monosomy rescue, chromosome gets duplicated and it can cause problems in gene expression pattern (like in this case).
2. Epimutation on maternal chromosome 14 (in 10–20% cases). Epimutation doesn't affect DNA, but rather by gene expression by chemical interactions. In that case genes on maternal chromosome 14 gets methylated and subsequently deactivated.
3. Deletion of 14q32.2 (in 10–20% of cases). In that case part of the maternal chromosome 14 gets deleted.

The genes which mutation can cause KOS are located on 14q32.2 and these genes are: MEG3, RTL1, MEG8.

== Diagnosis ==
Diagnosis can be suspected by facial features and by coat-hanger angle, but it can be confirmed by genetic testing.

== Treatment ==
This disease does not have a cure; the management of that disease is symptomatic.

== Prognosis ==
This disease has a poor prognosis, because 30% of patients die shortly after birth or during early infancy. Although there are patients who are adults and one of the oldest patient is 35 (at the article publication time).

== History ==
KOS was first described by Wang et al in 1991. The name was coined from Masayo Kagami and Tsutomu Ogata, who described it in details.

== Prevalence ==
According to one study, the prevalence of that disease is less than a 1/1,000,000 with over 80 cases having been reported.
