= Polar overdominance =

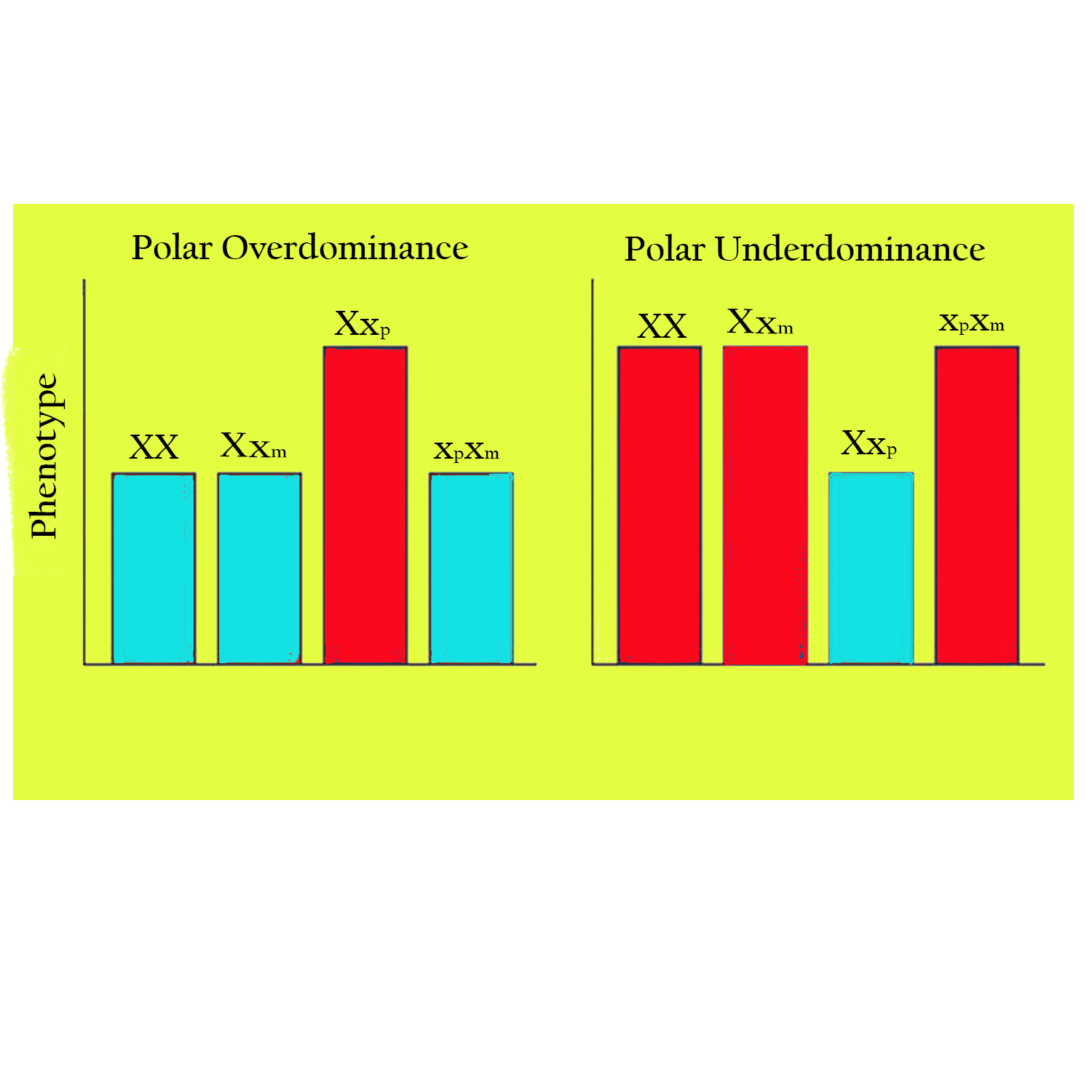
This figure depicts a generic graphical comparison of polar over dominance and polar under dominance. Differential inheritance is shown in a parent-of-origin type fashion in this case.

Polar overdominance is a unique form of inheritance originally described in livestock, with relevant examples in humans and mice being discovered shortly after. The term polar is used to describe this type of overdominance because the phenotype of the heterozygote is more prevalent than the other genotypes. This polarity is shown as differential phenotype is only present in one of the heterozygote configurations when the recessive allele is inherited in a parent of origin type fashion. Polar overdominance differs from regular overdominance (also known as heterozygote advantage) where both heterozygote genotypes display a phenotype that has increased fitness regardless of the parent of origin. Studying this type of inheritance could have practical applications in preventative medicine for humans as well as a variety of other agricultural applications.

== Discovery ==
The first described occurrence of polar overdominance in sheep was shown after finding that a mutant allele, called callipyge (after Venus Callipyge), must be inherited from the father to cause a condition called muscle hypertrophy. Muscle hypertrophy in the offspring is caused by an increase in the size and proportion of muscle fibers, namely the fast-twitch muscle fibers. This increase is generally located in the hind quarters and torso. Muscle hypertrophy only manifests itself in the offspring approximately one month after birth. Polar overdominance shows evidence of an imprinted locus displayed as the difference between the expression of heterozygote phenotypes in a parent-of-origin type fashion. It was discovered that a single-nucleotide polymorphism in the DLK1–DIO3 imprinted gene cluster affects the gene expression of paternal allele-specific genes and several maternal allele-specific long non-coding RNA and microRNA. Ectopic expression of the Delta-like 1 homologue (DLK1) and the Retrotransposon-like 1 (RTL1/PEG11) genes which are paternally expressed proteins in skeletal muscle are a hallmark of these mutant individuals.

== Agricultural application ==
More and more studies have identified quantitative trait loci (QTL) that show evidence of genomic imprinting in farm animals other than sheep. After polar overdominant inheritance was discovered to be the cause of muscular hypertrophy in sheep, the ortholog for the human DLK1 gene (DLK1-GTL2 intergenic region) was studied in pigs to try to determine the effects of inheritance on ham weight. The original purpose of this study was to find the connection between genetics and ham weight to try to produce pigs that were abnormally large compared to the average. Before conducting this research, it was also hypothesized that the locus for ham weight was related to the ovine callipyge locus in sheep. After researching it was discovered that the two regions were likely unrelated due to different forms of parental inheritance exhibited in both cases and a relatively large physical distance between the loci on the chromosome. Unlike the form of paternal polar overdominance that occurs in the ovine callipyge locus, the locus that controls ham weight operates in a maternal polar overdominant fashion.

== In humans ==
The term polar is used to describe this type of inheritance because the phenotype of one heterozygote is expressed at a level higher than other genotypes for the same locus including those displaying either homozygous geneotype. This unique form of inheritance has largely been studied in non-human mammals since 1996 until it was first described in humans in 2008. In humans, the inheritance of the alleles for the DLK1 gene (imprinted in eutherian mammals) is linked to a higher rate of obesity in the F1 generation. The imprinted DLK1-GTL2 in sheep is homologous to the DLK1 gene in humans, and includes the callipyge locus. There has been evidence to show that by screening potential fathers for a mutation at the DLK1 locus one could potentially see if their child is at a higher risk for obesity. Individuals who inherit this mutant allele from their father are more likely to show signs of obesity because the DLK1 gene is key in adipogenesis, or more simply the formation of fat cells.

== See also ==
- Imprinting (genetics)
- MEG3 - a gene occasionally expressed through polar overdominance
