= U69 =

U69 may refer to:

- Duchesne Municipal Airport
- German submarine U-69, various vessels
- Great inverted snub icosidodecahedron
- HMS Redpole (U69), a sloop of the Royal Navy
- Small nucleolar RNA SNORA69
- Uppland Runic Inscription 69
