= Small nucleolar RNA SNORA35 =

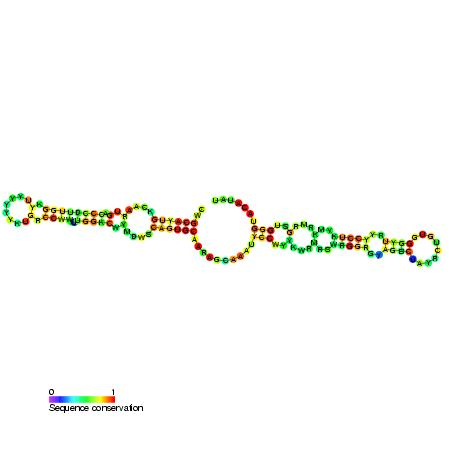
- Predicted secondary structure and sequence conservation of SNORA35

Identifiers
- Symbol: SNORA35
- Alt. Symbols: snoHBI-36
- Rfam: RF00566

Other data
- RNA type: Gene; snRNA; snoRNA; HACA-box
- Domain: Eukaryota
- GO: GO:0006396 GO:0005730
- SO: SO:0000594
- PDB structures: PDBe

In molecular biology, Homo sapiens snoRA35 (also known as HBI-36) is an H/ACA box snoRNA, first cloned from a mouse adult brain cDNA library by Cavaillé et al. (2000), and is found to be specifically expressed in the choroid plexus. Its human orthologue, HBI-36 was discovered by a homology search and was discovered to be specifically expressed in the brain. Its gene resides in the second intron of the serotonin receptor 2c (5HT-2c) gene, which is predominantly expressed in choroid plexus epithelial cells. The human 5HT-2c mRNA was predicted to be 2'-O-methylated by the C/D box snoRNP HBII-52 at a position also subjected to A-to-I editing. HBI-36 has no documented RNA target.
