= Small nucleolar RNA SNORD90 =

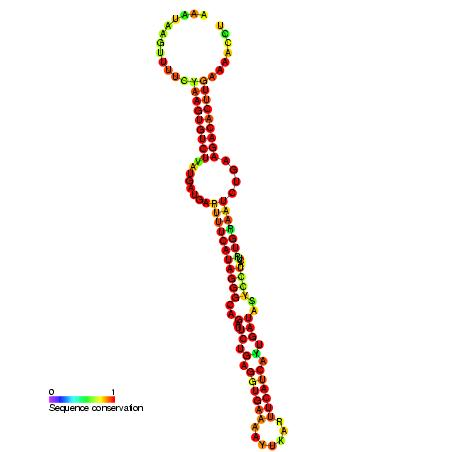
- Predicted secondary structure and sequence conservation of SNORD90

Identifiers
- Symbol: SNORD90
- Alt. Symbols: snoHBII-295
- Rfam: RF00579

Other data
- RNA type: Gene; snRNA; snoRNA; C/D-box
- Domain: Eukaryota
- GO: GO:0006396 GO:0005730
- SO: SO:0000593
- PDB structures: PDBe

In molecular biology, snoRNA SNORD90 (HBII-295) is a non-coding RNA that belongs to the family of C/D snoRNAs. Initially described as HBII-295 this RNA has now been called SNORD70 by the HUGO Gene Nomenclature Committee. It is the human orthologue of the mouse MBII-295 and has no identified RNA target. This RNA is expressed from an intron of the MNAB/OR1K1 gene.

There is evidence that SNORD90 is involved in guiding N6-methyladenosine (m6A) modifications onto target RNA transcripts. Specifically, SNORD90 has been shown to increase m6A levels on neuregulin 3 (NRG3) leading to its down-regulation through recognition by YTHDF2.
