= Small nucleolar RNA SNORD113 =

Small nucleolar RNA SNORD113/SNORD114 family
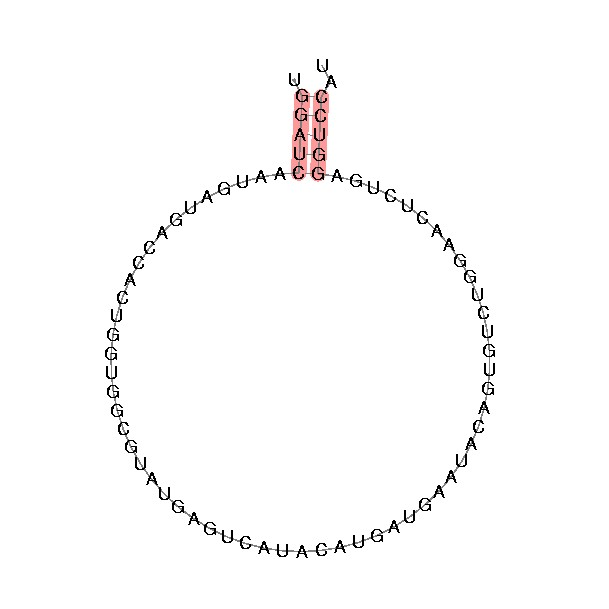
- Predicted secondary structure and sequence conservation of SNORD113

Identifiers
- Symbol: SNORD113
- Alt. Symbols: sno_14q_I_II; sno_14q_I
- Rfam: RF00181

Other data
- RNA type: Gene; snRNA; snoRNA; CD-box
- Domain: Eukaryota
- GO: GO:0006396 GO:0005730
- SO: SO:0000593
- PDB structures: PDBe

In molecular biology, Small nucleolar RNA SNORD113 (also known as C/D box snoRNA 14q(I)) is a small nucleolar RNA molecule which is located in the imprinted human 14q32 locus and may play a role in the evolution and/or mechanism of the epigenetic imprinting process.

In humans the imprinted domain at 14q32 contains two clusters of tandemly repeated small nucleolar RNAs named 14q(I) and 14q(II) snoRNAs. These two clusters contain 9 and 31 highly related snoRNAs respectively. These two related snoRNAs are known as SNORD113 and SNORD114 respectively in the HGNC approved gene symbol nomenclature. The snoRNAs found in each cluster are clearly related and are simply referred to with a 1-9 or 1-31 suffix. All the snoRNAs in these clusters are intron encoded and are processed from the tissue-specific non-coding human MEG8 RNA, which lies downstream of the imprinted genes DLK1 and GTL2.

SNORD113 and SNORD114 belong to the C/D box class of snoRNAs which contain the conserved sequence motifs known as the C box (UGAUGA) and the D box (CUGA). Most of the members of the box C/D family function in directing site-specific 2'-O-methylation of substrate RNAs. However, SNORD113 and SNORD114 differ from most C/D box snoRNAs in their expression profiles (which is tissue specific) and the lack of complementarity to rRNA and SnRNA. As a result, they are not predicted to guide to 2'O-methylation of a rRNA or snRNA.

Homologues of SNORD113 and SNORD114 are found in the imprinted non-coding mouse transcript Rian where they are again found in tandem array of 9 highly related snoRNAs. These snoRNAs also display tissue specific (brain) expression. C/D box snoRNAs were also identified in the rat non-coding Bsr (brain-specific repetitive) RNA.

Another imprinted human locus 15q11q13 encodes tandemly repeated C/D box snoRNA genes which are expressed only from the paternal chromosome. Studies of human and mouse model systems have shown that deletion of the 29 copies of the C/D box snoRNA SNORD116 (HBII-85) from this locus has been shown to be the primary cause of Prader-Willi syndrome. A possible role for tandemly repeated C/D snoRNA genes in the evolution and/or mechanism of the epigenetic imprinting process has been suggested.
