= METTL16 =

Protein-coding gene in the species Homo sapiens

Identifiers
- Aliases: METTL16, METT10D, methyltransferase like 16, methyltransferase 16, N6-methyladenosine
- External IDs: MGI: 1914743; GeneCards: METTL16
Available structures
PDB	Ortholog search: PDBe RCSB
PDB	List of PDB id codes 2H00
Enzyme activity
EC #	BRENDA	ExPASy	KEGG	MetaCyc
2.1.1.346	↗	↗	↗	↗
2.1.1.348	↗	↗	↗	↗

Gene location (Human)
Chr.	Chromosome 17 (human)
Band	17p13.3	Start	2,405,562 bp
Band	17p13.3	End	2,511,891 bp

Gene location (Mouse)
Chr.	Chromosome 11 (mouse)
Band	11|11 B5	Start	74,661,656 bp
Band	11|11 B5	End	74,719,351 bp
RNA expression pattern
Bgee	Human / Mouse (ortholog); Top expressed in: Achilles tendon; gingival epithelium; buccal mucosa cell; sperm; saphenous vein; nipple; urethra; gonad; germinal epithelium; ventricular zone / Top expressed in: hand; superior cervical ganglion; otolith organ; epiblast; utricle; supraoptic nucleus; tail of embryo; retinal pigment epithelium; yolk sac; mandibular prominence; More reference expression data
BioGPS	n/a
Gene ontology
Molecular function	methyltransferase activity; transferase activity; 23S rRNA (adenine(1618)-N(6))-methyltransferase activity; mRNA (2'-O-methyladenosine-N6-)-methyltransferase activity; U6 snRNA 3'-end binding; RNA stem-loop binding; U6 snRNA (adenine-(43)-N(6))-methyltransferase activity; RNA binding; mRNA (N6-adenosine)-methyltransferase activity
Cellular component	nucleus
Biological process	rRNA base methylation; methylation; posttranscriptional regulation of gene expression; mRNA methylation; snRNA (adenine-N6)-methylation; mRNA processing; RNA splicing; regulation of mRNA splicing, via spliceosome; RNA methylation; mRNA catabolic process; S-adenosylmethionine biosynthetic process; mRNA destabilization
Sources:Amigo / QuickGO
Orthologs
Databases	NCBI: entry; OMA: entry
Species	Human	Mouse
Entrez	79066	67493
Ensembl	ENSG00000127804	ENSMUSG00000010554
UniProt	Q86W50	Q9CQG2
RefSeq (mRNA)	NM_024086	NM_026197
RefSeq (protein)	NP_076991	NP_080473
Location (UCSC)	Chr 17: 2.41 – 2.51 Mb	Chr 11: 74.66 – 74.72 Mb
PubMed search
- Wikidata
View/Edit Human	View/Edit Mouse

RNA N6-adenosine-methyltransferase METTL16 is a protein that in humans is encoded by the METTL16 gene.

== See also ==
- DNA/RNA methyltransferase
  - m^{6}A methyltransferase complex
- N^{6}-Methyladenosine (m^{6}A)
