= YTH protein domain =

Identifiers
- Symbol: YTH
- Pfam: PF04146
- Pfam clan: CL0178
- InterPro: IPR007275
Available protein structures:
- Pfam: structures / ECOD
- PDB: RCSB PDB; PDBe; PDBj
- PDBsum: structure summary

In molecular biology, the protein domain YTH refers to a member of the YTH family that has been shown to selectively remove transcripts of meiosis-specific genes expressed in mitotic cells. They also play a role in the epitranscriptome as reader proteins for m6A.

This protein domain, the YTH-domain, is conserved across all eukaryotes and suggests that the conserved C-terminal region plays a critical role in relaying the cytosolic Ca-signals to the nucleus, thereby regulating gene expression.

== Function/mechanism ==
It has been speculated that in higher order eukaryotic organisms, YTH-family members may be involved in similar mechanisms to suppress gene regulation during gametogenesis or general silencing. The rat protein YT521-B, SWISSPROT, is a tyrosine-phosphorylated nuclear protein, that interacts with the nuclear transcriptosomal component scaffold attachment factor B, and the 68kDa Src substrate associated during mitosis, Sam68. In vivo splicing assays demonstrated that YT521-B modulates alternative splice site selection in a concentration-dependent manner. Additionally, it is also thought that the YTH domain has a role in RNA binding.

The YTH domain proteins also serve as readers for the N6-methyladenosine (m6A) mRNA modification by scanning the mRNA to find the modified bases. The YTH domain proteins YTHDF1, YTHDF2, and YTHDF3 can bind to modified bases and the surrounding bases. These YTH proteins recognize RRACH sequences (with the A being the modified m6A, R being a purine, and H being an A, C, or U) and use these sequences as binding sites, allowing them to “read” the modification. The YTHDF2 proteins remove the adenylation on the m6A, destabilizing the RNA transcript and preventing translation. The YTHDF1 proteins have the opposite effect and promote the initiation of translation through their interactions with the 40S ribosomal subunit.

== Structure ==
The domain is predicted to be a mixed alpha/beta-fold containing four alpha helices and six beta strands. Crystallography studies of these YTH domain proteins show that they have a common hydrophobic region that has been proven to participate in the proteins binding to m6A since mutations in this region decrease binding affinity.

== Plant ==
In plant cells environmental stimuli, which light, pathogens, hormones, and abiotic stresses, elicit changes in the cytosolic calcium levels but little is known of the cytosolic-nuclear Ca-signaling pathway; where gene regulation occurs to respond appropriately to the stress. It has been demonstrated that two novel Arabidopsis thaliana (Mouse-ear cress) proteins, (ECT1 and ECT2), specifically associated with Calcineurin B-Like-Interacting Protein Kinase1 (CIPK1), a member of Ser/Thr protein kinases that interact with the calcineurin B-like Ca-binding proteins. These two proteins contain a very similar C-terminal region (180 amino acids in length, 81% similarity), which is required and sufficient for both interaction with CIPK1 and translocation to the nucleus.
