= Temple syndrome =

- Other names: TS, TS14
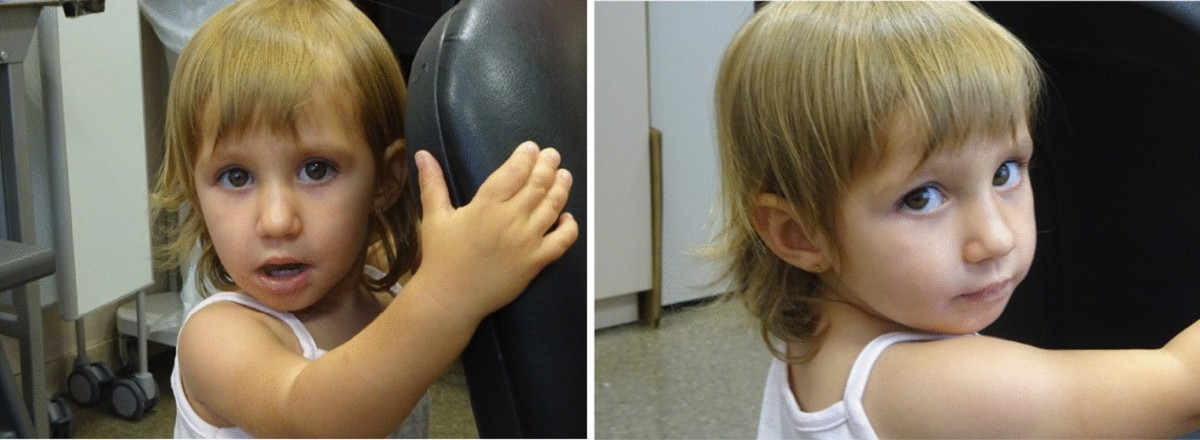
- A photo showing person with Temple syndrome, with small hands, short philtrum and a broad nose.
- Specialty: Medical genetics
- Symptoms: Hypotonia, motor delay, precocious puberty, small hands, short feet, intrauterine growth restriction
- Causes: Chromosomal nondisjunction, genetic mutations
- Diagnostic method: Genetic testing
- Differential diagnosis: Prader-Willi Syndrome, Silver–Russell syndrome

Temple syndrome is a rare genetic disorder that is caused by mutations in paternal chromosome 14 or by maternal UPD(14). The signs of this syndrome are oligohydramnios, intrauterine growth restriction, small placenta, low birth weight and length, hypotonia, motor and speech delay, joint laxity, clinodactyly, kyphoscoliosis, precocious puberty, obesity and the facial signs are: trigonocephaly, depressed nasal bridge, broad nose, small jaw, high-arched palate.

== Symptoms ==
The symptoms of this syndrome are:

Very frequent

- Hypotonia
- Motor delay
- Precocious puberty
- Small hand
- Short foot
- Intrauterine Growth Restriction

Frequent

- Delayed speech
- Feeding difficulties
- Obesity
- Premature birth
- Short stature

Occasional

- Undescended testis
- Polyphagia
- Scoliosis
- Type II diabetes

Very rare

- Bifid uvula
- Clinodactyly
- Frontal bossing
- Hydrocephalus
- Pointed chin
- Recurrent hypoglycaemia

== Cause ==
There are three main mechanisms that can cause Temple syndrome:

1. Maternal unipaternal disomy of chromosome 14 (in 60-75% cases): That phenomenon can be caused by trisomy rescue. Maternal UPD arises from nondisjunction in oocyte and causes trisomy when it gets fertilised, there will be 3 chromosomes(trisomy) which is fatal most of the times, so one of the chromosome gets lost and it can get two results: biparental contribution of chromosome or maternal heterodisomy. Last one can cause Temple Syndrome.
2. Epimutaion (in 10-20% cases): Epimutation is a phenomenon when DNA gets mutated although it doesn’t change coding sequence. The genes on Paternal Chromosome 14 gets hypomethylated and subsequently causes silencing of those genes.
3. Deletion of the 14q32.2 region (in 5-15% cases): Cases when 14q32.2 region gets deleted is the rarest. In that case part of Paternal chromosome 14 gets deleted.

The genes which mutations are responsible for causing this syndrome are DLK1 and RTL1. DIO3 mutation is also associated with Temple syndrome.

== Diagnosis ==
Temple syndrome can be suspected by combination of symptoms and diagnosis confirmed through genetic testing.

== Treatment ==
There is no cure for this disease, but symptomatic management is available.

== Prognosis ==
The prognosis of this disease is unclarified.

== History ==
Temple Syndrome was first described by I K Temple in 1991.
