= Small nucleolar RNA =

Class of small RNA molecules

Small nucleolar RNAs (snoRNAs) are a class of non-coding small RNA molecules in the nucleolus that primarily guide chemical modifications of other RNAs, mainly ribosomal RNAs, transfer RNAs and small nuclear RNAs. There are two main classes of snoRNA, the C/D box snoRNAs, which are associated with methylation, and the H/ACA box snoRNAs, which are associated with pseudouridylation. SnoRNAs are commonly referred to as guide RNAs but should not be confused with the guide RNAs that direct RNA editing in trypanosomes or the guide RNAs (gRNAs) used by Cas9 for CRISPR gene editing.

== snoRNA guided modifications ==
After transcription, nascent rRNA molecules (termed pre-rRNA) undergo a series of processing steps to generate the mature rRNA molecule. Prior to cleavage by exo- and endonucleases, the pre-rRNA undergoes a complex pattern of nucleoside modifications. These include methylations and pseudouridylations, guided by snoRNAs.

- Methylation is the attachment or substitution of a methyl group onto various substrates. The rRNA of humans contain approximately 115 methyl group modifications. The majority of these are 2′O-ribose-methylations (where the methyl group is attached to the ribose group).
- Pseudouridylation is the conversion (isomerisation) of the nucleoside uridine to a different isomeric form pseudouridine (Ψ). This modification consists of a 180º rotation of the uridine base around its glycosyl bond to the ribose of the RNA backbone. After this rotation, the nitrogenous base contributes a carbon atom to the glycosyl bond instead of the usual nitrogen atom. The beneficial aspect of this modification is the additional hydrogen-bond donor available on the base. While uridine makes two hydrogen-bonds with its Watson-Crick base pair, adenine, pseudouridine is capable of making three hydrogen bonds. When pseudouridine is base-paired with adenine, it can also make another hydrogen bond, allowing the complexity of the mature rRNA structure to take form. The free hydrogen-bond donor often forms a bond with a base that is distant from itself, creating the tertiary structure that rRNA must have to be functional. Mature human rRNAs contain approximately 95 Ψ modifications.

=== snoRNP ===
Each snoRNA molecule acts as a guide for only one (or two) individual modifications in a target RNA. In order to carry out modification, each snoRNA associates with at least four core proteins in an RNA/protein complex referred to as a small nucleolar ribonucleoprotein particle (snoRNP). The proteins associated with each RNA depend on the type of snoRNA molecule (see snoRNA guide families below). The snoRNA molecule contains an antisense element (a stretch of 10–20 nucleotides), which are base complementary to the sequence surrounding the base (nucleotide) targeted for modification in the pre-RNA molecule. This enables the snoRNP to recognise and bind to the target RNA. Once the snoRNP has bound to the target site, the associated proteins are in the correct physical location to catalyse the chemical modification of the target base.

== snoRNA guide families ==
The two different types of rRNA modification (methylation and pseudouridylation) are directed by two different families of snoRNAs. These families of snoRNAs are referred to as antisense C/D box and H/ACA box snoRNAs based on the presence of conserved sequence motifs in the snoRNA. There are exceptions, but as a general rule C/D box members guide methylation and H/ACA members guide pseudouridylation. The members of each family may vary in biogenesis, structure, and function, but each family is classified by the following generalised characteristics. For more detail, see review. SnoRNAs are classified under small nuclear RNA in MeSH. The HGNC, in collaboration with snoRNABase and experts in the field, has approved unique names for human genes that encode snoRNAs.

=== C/D box ===
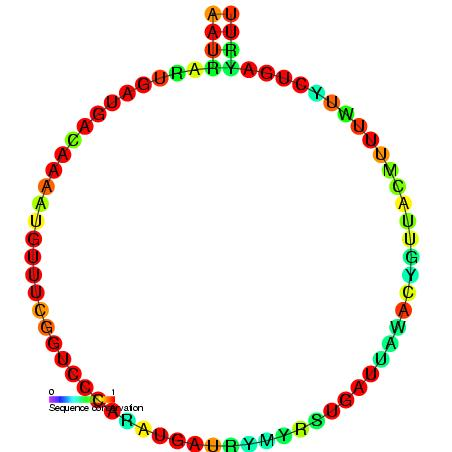
Example of a C/D box snoRNA secondary structure taken from the Rfam database. This example is SNORD73 (RF00071).

C/D box snoRNAs contain two short conserved sequence motifs, C (RUGAUGA) and D (CUGA), located near the 5′ and 3′ ends of the snoRNA, respectively. Short regions (~ 5 nucleotides) located upstream of the C box and downstream of the D box are usually base complementary and form a stem-box structure, which brings the C and D box motifs into close proximity. This stem-box structure has been shown to be essential for correct snoRNA synthesis and nucleolar localization. Many C/D box snoRNA also contain an additional less-well-conserved copy of the C and D motifs (referred to as C' and D') located in the central portion of the snoRNA molecule. A conserved region of 10–21 nucleotides upstream of the D box is complementary to the methylation site of the target RNA and enables the snoRNA to form an RNA duplex with the RNA. The nucleotide to be modified in the target RNA is usually located at the 5th position upstream from the D box (or D' box). C/D box snoRNAs associate with four evolutionary conserved and essential proteins—fibrillarin (Nop1p), NOP56, NOP58, and SNU13 (15.5-kD protein in eukaryotes; its archaeal homolog is L7Ae)—which make up the core C/D box snoRNP.

There exists a eukaryotic C/D box snoRNA (snoRNA U3) that has not been shown to guide 2′-O-methylation. Instead, it functions in rRNA processing by directing pre-rRNA cleavage.

=== H/ACA box ===
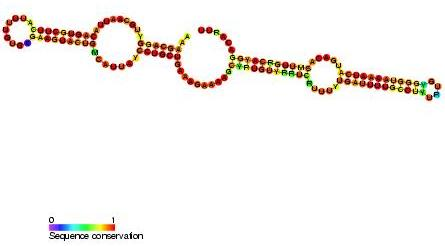
Example of a H/ACA box snoRNA secondary structure taken from the Rfam database. This example is SNORA69 (RF00265).

H/ACA box snoRNAs have a common secondary structure consisting of a two hairpins and two single-stranded regions termed a hairpin-hinge-hairpin-tail structure. H/ACA snoRNAs also contain conserved sequence motifs known as H box (consensus ANANNA) and the ACA box (ACA). Both motifs are usually located in the single-stranded regions of the secondary structure. The H motif is located in the hinge and the ACA motif is located in the tail region; 3 nucleotides from the 3′ end of the sequence. The hairpin regions contain internal bulges known as recognition loops in which the antisense guide sequences (bases complementary to the target sequence) are located. These guide sequences essentially mark the location of the uridine on the target rRNA that is going to be modified. This recognition sequence is bipartite (constructed from the two different arms of the loop region) and forms complex pseudo-knots with the target RNA. H/ACA box snoRNAs associate with four evolutionary conserved and essential proteins—dyskerin (Cbf5p), GAR1, NHP2, and NOP10—which make up the core of the H/ACA box snoRNP. Dyskerin is likely the catalytic component of the ribonucleoprotein (RNP) complex because it possesses several conserved pseudouridine synthase sequences, and is closely related to the pseudouridine synthase that modifies uridine in tRNA. In lower eukaryotic cells such as trypanosomes, similar RNAs exist in the form of single hairpin structure and an AGA box instead of ACA box at the 3′ end of the RNA. Like Trypanosomes, Entamoeba histolytica has mix population of single hairpin as well as double hairpin H/ACA box snoRNAs. It was reported that there occurred processing of the double hairpin H/ACA box snoRNA to the single hairpin snoRNAs however, unlike trypanosomes, it has a regular ACA motif at 3′ tail.^{[19]}

The RNA component of human telomerase (hTERC) contains an H/ACA domain for pre-RNP formation and nucleolar localization of the telomerase RNP itself. The H/ACA snoRNP has been implicated in the rare genetic disease dyskeratosis congenita (DKC) due to its affiliation with human telomerase. Mutations in the protein component of the H/ACA snoRNP result in a reduction in physiological TERC levels. This has been strongly correlated with the pathology behind DKC, which seems to be primarily a disease of poor telomere maintenance.

=== Composite H/ACA and C/D box ===
An unusual guide snoRNA U85 that functions in both 2′-O-ribose methylation and pseudouridylation of small nuclear RNA (snRNA) U5 has been identified. This composite snoRNA contains both C/D and H/ACA box domains and associates with the proteins specific to each class of snoRNA (fibrillarin and Gar1p, respectively). More composite snoRNAs have now been characterised.

These composite snoRNAs have been found to accumulate in a subnuclear organelle called the Cajal body and are referred to as small Cajal body-specific RNAs (scaRNAs). This is in contrast to the majority of C/D box or H/ACA box snoRNAs, which localise to the nucleolus. These Cajal body specific RNAs are proposed to be involved in the modification of RNA polymerase II transcribed spliceosomal RNAs U1, U2, U4, U5 and U12. Not all snoRNAs that have been localised to Cajal bodies are composite C/D and H/ACA box snoRNAs.

=== Orphan snoRNAs ===
The targets for newly identified snoRNAs are predicted on the basis of sequence complementarity between putative target RNAs and the antisense elements or recognition loops in the snoRNA sequence. However, there are increasing numbers of 'orphan' guides without any known RNA targets, which suggests that there might be more proteins or transcripts involved in rRNA than previously and/or that some snoRNAs have different functions not concerning rRNA. There is evidence that some of these orphan snoRNAs regulate alternatively spliced transcripts. For example, it appears that the C/D box snoRNA SNORD115 regulates the alternative splicing of the serotonin 2C receptor mRNA via a conserved region of complementarity. Another C/D box snoRNA, SNORD116, that resides in the same cluster as SNORD115 has been predicted to have 23 possible targets within protein coding genes using a bioinformatic approach. Of these, a large fraction were found to be alternatively spliced, suggesting a role of SNORD116 in the regulation of alternative splicing.

More recently, SNORD90 has been suggested to be able to guide N6-methyladenosine (m6A) modifications onto target RNA transcripts. More specifically, Lin et al. demonstrated that SNORD90 can reduce the expression of neuregulin 3 (NRG3).

== Target modifications ==
The precise effect of the methylation and pseudouridylation modifications on the function of the mature RNAs is not yet known. The modifications do not appear to be essential but are known to subtly enhance the RNA folding and interaction with ribosomal proteins. In support of their importance, target site modifications are exclusively located within conserved and functionally important domains of the mature RNA and are commonly conserved among distant eukaryotes. A novel method, Nm-REP-seq, was developed for enriching 2'-O-Methylations guided by C/D snoRNAs by using RNA exoribonuclease (Mycoplasma genitalium RNase R, MgR) and periodate oxidation reactivity to eliminate 2'-hydroxylated (2'-OH) nucleosides.

1. 2′-O-methylated ribose causes an increase in the 3′-endo conformation
2. Pseudouridine (psi/Ψ) adds another option for H-bonding.
3. Heavily methylated RNA is protected from hydrolysis. rRNA acts as a ribozyme by catalyzing its own hydrolysis and splicing.

== Genomic organisation ==
SnoRNAs are located diversely in the genome. The majority of vertebrate snoRNA genes are encoded in the introns of genes encoding proteins involved in ribosome synthesis or translation, and are synthesized by RNA polymerase II. SnoRNAs are also shown to be located in intergenic regions, ORFs of protein coding genes, and UTRs. SnoRNAs can also be transcribed from their own promoters by RNA polymerase II or III.

=== Imprinted loci ===
In the human genome, there are at least two examples where C/D box snoRNAs are found in tandem repeats within imprinted loci. These two loci (14q32 on chromosome 14 and 15q11q13 on chromosome 15) have been extensively characterised, and in both regions multiple snoRNAs have been found located within introns in clusters of closely related copies.

In 15q11q13, five different snoRNAs have been identified (SNORD64, SNORD107, SNORD108, SNORD109 (two copies), SNORD116 (29 copies) and SNORD115 (48 copies). Loss of the 29 copies of SNORD116 (HBII-85) from this region has been identified as a cause of Prader-Willi syndrome whereas gain of additional copies of SNORD115 has been linked to autism.

Region 14q32 contains repeats of two snoRNAs SNORD113 (9 copies) and SNORD114 (31 copies) within the introns of a tissue-specific ncRNA transcript (MEG8). The 14q32 domain has been shown to share common genomic features with the imprinted 15q11-q13 loci and a possible role for tandem repeats of C/D box snoRNAs in the evolution or mechanism of imprinted loci has been suggested.

== Other functions ==
snoRNAs can function as miRNAs. It has been shown that human ACA45 is a bona fide snoRNA that can be processed into a 21-nucleotides-long mature miRNA by the RNAse III family endoribonuclease dicer. This snoRNA product has previously been identified as mmu-miR-1839 and was shown to be processed independently from the other miRNA-generating endoribonuclease drosha. Bioinformatical analyses have revealed that putatively snoRNA-derived, miRNA-like fragments occur in different organisms.

Recently, it has been found that snoRNAs can have functions not related to rRNA. One such function is the regulation of alternative splicing of the trans gene transcript, which is done by the snoRNA HBII-52, which is also known as SNORD115.

In November 2012, Schubert et al. revealed that specific RNAs control chromatin compaction and accessibility in Drosophila cells.

In July 2023, Lin et al. showed that snoRNAs have the potential to guide other RNA modifications, specifically N6-methyladenosine, however this is subject to further investigation.

== Examples ==
=== TB11Cs4H1 ===
TB11Cs4H1 is a member of the H/ACA-like class of non-coding RNA (ncRNA) molecule (a snoRNA) that guide the sites of modification of uridines to pseudouridines of substrate RNAs. TB11Cs4H1 is predicted to guide the pseudouridylation of LSU3 ribosomal RNA (rRNA) at residue Ψ1357.
