= Silver–Russell syndrome =

- Other names: Silver–Russell dwarfism
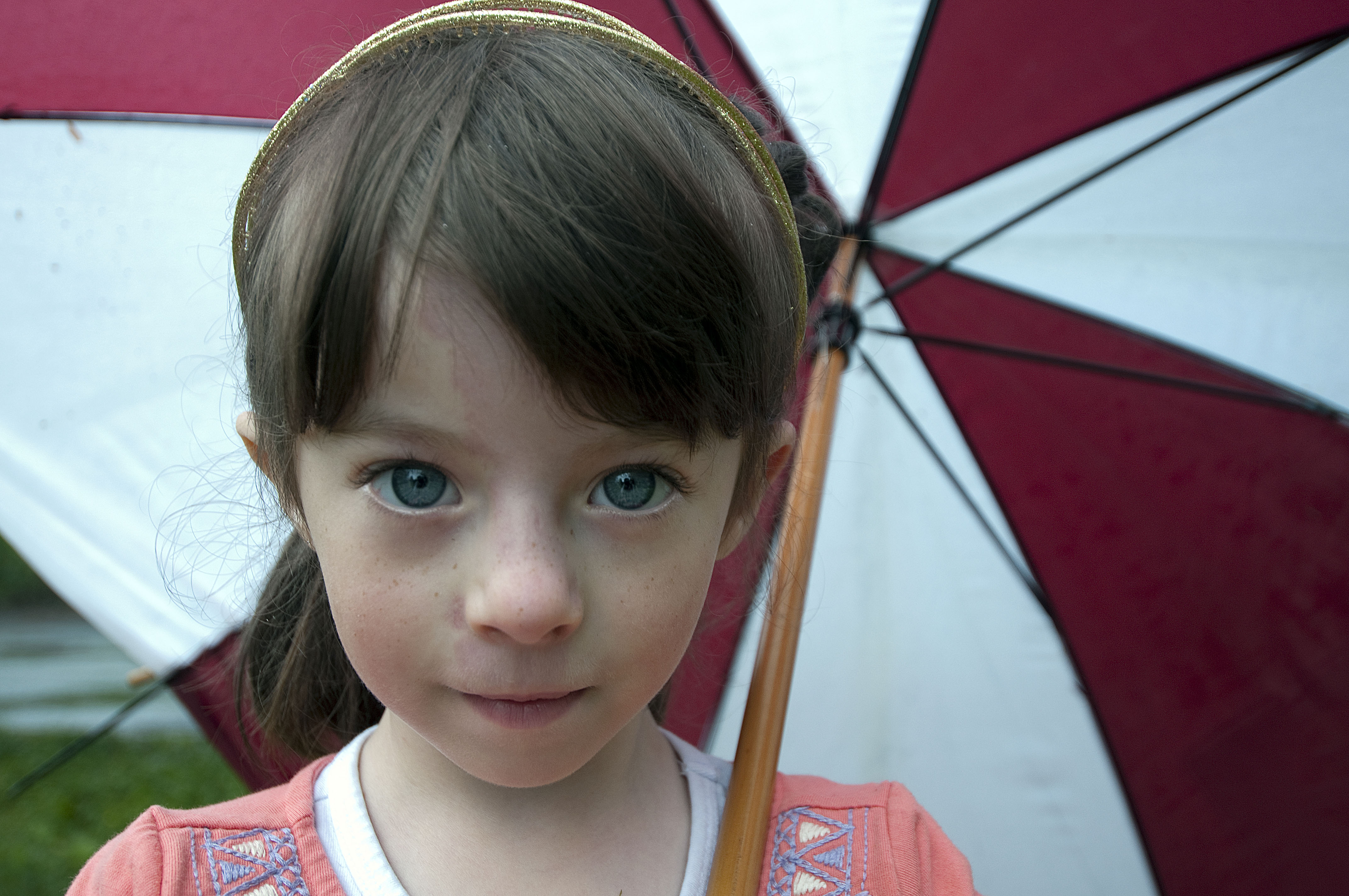
- A somewhat triangular head and delicate facial features are typical characteristics of Silver–Russell syndrome.
- Specialty: Medical genetics
- Frequency: 0.005%

Silver–Russell syndrome (SRS), also called Silver–Russell dwarfism, is a rare congenital growth disorder. In the United States it is usually referred to as Russell–Silver syndrome, and Silver–Russell syndrome elsewhere. It is one of 200 types of dwarfism and one of five types of primordial dwarfism.

Silver–Russell syndrome occurs in approximately one out of every 50,000 to 100,000 births. Males and females seem to be affected with equal frequency.

== Signs and symptoms ==
Although confirmation of a specific genetic marker is in a significant number of individuals, there are no tests to clearly determine if this is what a person has. As a syndrome, a diagnosis is typically given for children upon confirmation of the presence of several symptoms listed below.

Symptoms are intrauterine growth restriction (IUGR) combined with some of the following:

- Often small for gestational age (SGA) at birth (birth weight less than 2.8 kg), or within two or more standard deviations away from the mean weight of 2.8 kg.
- Feeding problems: the baby is uninterested in feeding and takes only small amounts with difficulty
- Hypoglycemia
- Excessive sweating as a baby, especially at night, and a greyness or pallor of the skin. This may be a symptom of hypoglycemia
- Triangular face with a small jaw and a pointed chin that tends to lessen slightly with age. The mouth tends to curve down
- A blue tinge to the whites of the eyes in younger children
- Head circumference may be of normal size and disproportionate to a small body size
- Wide and late-closing fontanelle
- Clinodactyly
- Body asymmetry: one side of the body grows more slowly than the other
- Continued poor growth with no "catch up" into the normal centile lines on growth chart, translating to a low BMI score
- Precocious puberty (occasionally)
- Low muscle tone
- Gastroesophageal reflux disease
- A striking lack of subcutaneous fat
- Constipation (sometimes severe)
- Rarely found to have heart defects, typically ventricular septal defects and atrial septal defects

The earliest among these symptoms to appear is abnormal growth-related symptoms. These symptoms are traditionally noticed at birth and carry on throughout life. It has been noted that children with SRS may be within expected normal growth for their age earlier on but rarely show any signs of continued growth to catch up to the mean size for a child at later stages of their childhood.

The average adult height for patients without growth hormone treatment is 4'11" (149.9 cm) for males and 4'7" (139.7 cm) for females.

== Cause ==
Its exact cause is unknown, but present research points toward a genetic and epigenetic component, possibly following maternal genes on chromosomes 7 and 11. Half of patients with Silver–Russell syndrome do not have an identified molecular etiology which suggests the involvement of other unknown genes. Chromosomal imbalances of HMGA2 (high mobility AT-hook 2) located on chromosome 12 have been implicated with patients who do not have a classically identified genetic cause.

There has also been found to be a correlation between a mutation in gene site of PLAG1 on chromosome 8 which has been shown to link to growth restriction which correlates to Silver–Russell syndrome.

It is estimated that approximately 50% of Silver–Russell patients have hypomethylation of H19 and IGF2. This is thought to lead to low expression of IGF2 and over-expression of the H19 gene.

In 10% of the cases, the syndrome is associated with maternal uniparental disomy (UPD) on chromosome 7. This is the result of non-disjunction, where the person receives two copies of chromosome 7 from the mother (maternally inherited) rather than one from each parent. Normal expression requires IGF2 genes to be received from both parents, this may result in the same condition found in those with normal chromosomal inheritance but duplication events or hypomethylation.

Other genetic causes such as duplications, deletions and chromosomal aberrations have also linked to Silver–Russell syndrome.

Interestingly, patients with Silver–Russell syndrome have variable hypomethylation levels in different body tissues, suggesting a mosaic pattern and a postzygotic epigenetic modification issue. This could explain the body asymmetry frequently seen.

Like other imprinting disorders (e.g. Prader–Willi syndrome, Angelman syndrome, and Beckwith–Wiedemann syndrome), Silver–Russell syndrome may be associated with the use of assisted reproductive technologies such as in vitro fertilization.

== Diagnosis ==
For many years the diagnosis of Silver–Russell syndrome was clinical. However, this led to overlaps with syndromes with similar clinical features such as Temple syndrome and 12q14 microdeletion syndrome. In 2017, an international consensus was published – detailing the steps clinicians should take to diagnose Silver–Russell syndrome. Routine molecular testing is advised if there is reason to suspect SRS. At the current moment, it is recommended to test for 11p15 loss of methylation and mUPD7 first. If they are negative, then testing for mUPD16, mUPD20 should take place. Testing for 14q32 should also be considered, to rule out Temple syndrome as a differential diagnosis. If these tests come back inconclusive, then a clinical diagnosis should be made.

Different mechanisms for having SRS lead to different phenotypes being expressed. An example of this is that those who are found to have the mUPD7 condition are more likely to also have a speech delay and more difficulty learning.

It is recommended that the Netchine-Harbison clinical scoring system (NH-CSS) is used to group the clinical features together in a point based score. This score is made using six criteria: SGA birth, postnatal growth failure, relative macrocephaly at birth, prominent forehead, body asymmetry, and feeding difficulties. Scoring ≥4 on the NH-CSS is enough to clinically consider SRS as a possible disorder. The NH-CSS is not always reliable, especially when dealing with more rare monogenic forms of SRS.

== Treatment ==
Silver–Russell syndrome requires lifelong interdisciplinary care. The caloric intake of children with Silver–Russell syndrome must be carefully controlled in order to provide the best opportunity for growth. If the child is unable to tolerate oral feeding, then enteral feeding may be used, such as the percutaneous endoscopic gastrostomy.

In children with limb-length differences or scoliosis, physiotherapy can alleviate the problems caused by these symptoms. In more severe cases, surgery to lengthen limbs may be required. To prevent aggravating posture difficulties children with leg length differences may require a raise in their shoe.

Growth Hormone Therapy is often prescribed as part of the treatment of Silver–Russell syndrome. The hormones are given by injection typically daily from the age of 2 years old through teenage years. This type of treatment may start to show no effect after or soon before puberty ends. Although there are many other alternative treatments, none seem to work as well as Growth Hormone Therapy. It may be effective even when the patient does not have a growth hormone deficiency. Growth hormone therapy has been shown to increase the rate of growth in patients and consequently prompts 'catch up' growth. This may enable the child to begin their education at a normal height, improving their self-esteem and interaction with other children. Several studies have shown that growth hormone therapy significantly improves childhood growth and final adult height. There are some theories suggesting that the therapy also assists with muscular development and managing hypoglycemia. Improvements to both body composition as well as one's metabolic health have also been observed.

== Eponym/History ==
It is named for Henry Silver and Alexander Russell.

The first to document the syndrome was Henry Silver, who first discovered it when describing two children who had many of the symptoms of Silver–Russell syndrome, specifically the asymmetry part of the symptoms; this was discovered in 1953. Alexander Russell documented his findings in 1954, related to five children with Silver–Russell syndrome, two of which had asymmetry, completely independent from Henry Silver. Initially, the syndrome was split into two different syndromes: Silver Syndrome for the syndrome with asymmetry, and Russell Syndrome for the syndrome without asymmetry. These were later combined to what is now known as Silver-Russell Syndrome.
