= Prader–Willi syndrome =

Genetic disorder involving an imprinted genomic region

- Other names: Prader–Labhart–Willi–Fanconi syndrome
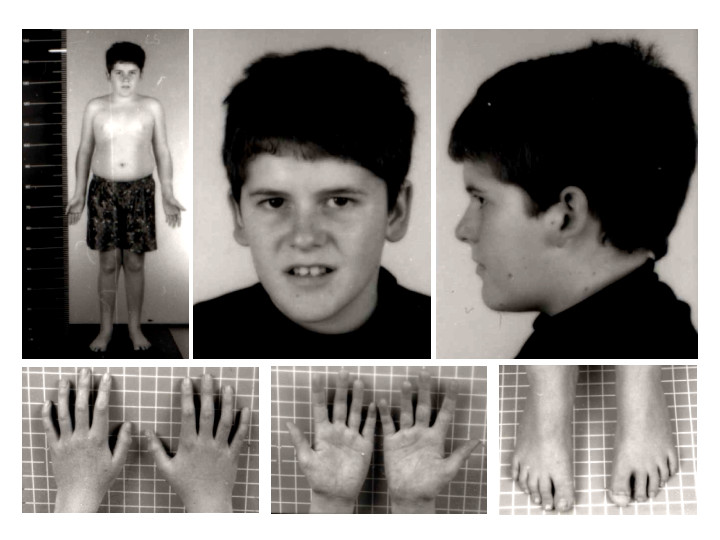
- 15-year-old patient with PWS
- Pronunciation: /ˈprɑːdər ˈvɪli/, /ˈpreɪdər wɪli/, /ˈprɑːdər ˈwɪli/
- Specialty: Genetics, endocrinology, pediatrics
- Symptoms: Babies: low muscle tone, poor feeding, slow development Children: constantly hungry, intellectual impairment, behavioural problems
- Usual onset: occurs at or near the time of conception for unknown reasons
- Duration: Lifelong
- Types: Three main molecular mechanisms result in PWS: paternal deletion, maternal UPD 15, and imprinting defects
- Causes: Genetic disorder (typically new mutation)
- Diagnostic method: Genetic testing
- Treatment: Feeding therapy, physical therapy, occupational therapy, strict food supervision, exercise program, counseling
- Medication: Growth hormone therapy
- Frequency: 1 in 15,000–20,000 people

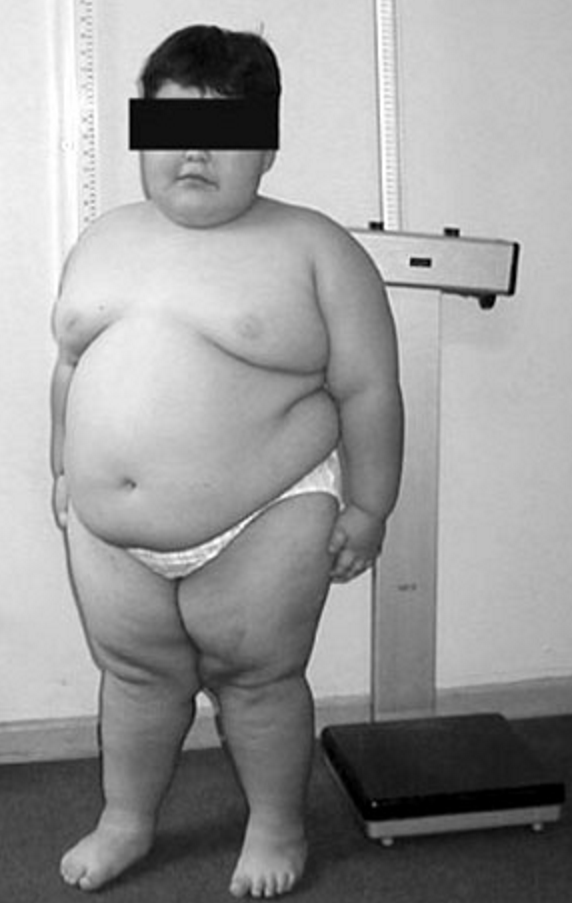
Eight-year-old patient with a severe form of PWS

Prader–Willi syndrome (PWS) is a rare genetic disorder caused by a loss of function of specific genes on chromosome 15. In babies, symptoms include weak muscles, poor feeding, and slow development. Beginning in childhood, those affected become constantly hungry, which often leads to obesity and type 2 diabetes. Mild to moderate intellectual impairment and behavioral problems are also typical of the disorder. Often, affected individuals have a narrow forehead, small hands and feet, short height, and light skin and hair. Most are unable to have children.

About 74% of cases occur when part of the father's chromosome 15 is deleted. In another 25% of cases, the affected person has two copies of the maternal chromosome 15 from the mother and lacks the paternal copy. As parts of the chromosome from the mother are turned off through imprinting, they end up with no working copies of certain genes. PWS is not generally inherited, but rather the genetic changes happen during the formation of the egg, sperm, or in early development. No risk factors are known for the disorder. Those who have one child with PWS have less than a 1% chance of the next child being affected. A similar mechanism occurs in Angelman syndrome, except the defective chromosome 15 is from the mother, or two copies are from the father.

Prader–Willi syndrome has no cure. Treatment may improve outcomes, especially if carried out early. In newborns, feeding difficulties may be supported with feeding tubes. Strict food supervision is typically required, starting around the age of three, in combination with an exercise program. Growth hormone therapy also improves outcomes. Counseling and medications may help with some behavioral problems. Group homes are often necessary in adulthood.

PWS affects between 1 in 10,000 to 30,000 people worldwide. More than 400,000 people live with PWS.

== Signs and symptoms ==
PWS symptoms can range from poor muscle tone during infancy to behavioral problems in early childhood. Some symptoms often found in infants, besides poor muscle tone, are a lack of eye coordination; almond-shaped eyes; thin upper lip; and, due to poor muscle tone, lack of a strong sucking reflex. Their cries are weak, and they have difficulty waking up.

More aspects seen in a clinical overview include hypotonia and abnormal neurologic function, hypogonadism, developmental and cognitive delays, hyperphagia and obesity, short stature, and behavioral and psychiatric disturbances.

The following features and signs are indicators of PWS, although not all will be present:

=== In-utero and birth ===
- Reduced fetal movement
- Frequent abnormal fetal position
- Occasional polyhydramnios (excessive amniotic fluid)
- Often breech or caesarean births
- Lethargy
- Hypotonia
- Feeding difficulties (due to poor muscle tone affecting sucking reflex)
- Difficulties establishing respiration
- Hypogonadism

=== Childhood ===
- Delayed milestones/intellectual delay
- Excessive sleeping
- Strabismus (crossed eyes)
- Scoliosis (often not detected at birth)
- Cryptorchidism
- Speech delay
- Poor physical coordination
- Hyperphagia (excessive hunger) begins between the ages of 2 and 8, and continues throughout adulthood.
- Excessive weight gain
- Sleep disorders
- Delayed puberty
- Short stature
- Obesity
- Extreme flexibility
- Narrow forehead at the temples
- Narrow nose bridge
- Thin upper lip
- Downturned mouth
- Unusually fair hair, skin, and eyes
- Small hands and feet
- Tooth decay owing to the underproduction of saliva
- Constipation or swollen stomachs owing to poor muscle tone in the gut
- Low levels of HGH

=== Adulthood ===
- Infertility (males and females)
- Hypogonadism
- Sparse pubic hair
- Obesity
- Hypotonia (low muscle tone)
- Learning disabilities/borderline intellectual functioning (but some cases of average intelligence)
- Prone to type 2 diabetes mellitus
- Extreme flexibility

=== Appearance ===
- Prominent nasal bridge
- Small hands and feet with tapering of fingers
- Soft skin, which is easily bruised
- Excess fat, especially in the central portion of the body
- High, narrow forehead
- Thin top lip
- Downturned mouth
- Almond-shaped eyes
- Light skin and hair relative to other family members
- Lack of complete sexual development
- Frequent skin picking
- Stretch marks
- Delayed motor development

=== Neurocognitive ===
Individuals with PWS are at risk of learning and attention difficulties. Curfs and Fryns (1992) conducted research into the varying degrees of learning disability found in PWS.

Cassidy found that 40% of individuals with PWS have borderline/low average intelligence, a figure higher than the 32% found in Curfs and Fryns' study. However, both studies suggest that most individuals (50–65%) fall within the mild/borderline/low average intelligence range.

Children with PWS show an unusual cognitive profile. They are often strong in visual organization and perception, including reading and vocabulary, but their spoken language (sometimes affected by hypernasality) is generally poorer than their comprehension. A marked skill in completing jigsaw puzzles has been noted, but this may be an artifact of increased practice.

Auditory information processing and sequential processing are relatively poor, as are arithmetic and writing skills, visual and auditory short-term memory, and auditory attention span. These sometimes improve with age, but deficits in these areas remain throughout adulthood.

PWS may be associated with psychosis.

=== Behavioral ===
PWS is frequently associated with a constant insatiable appetite, which persists no matter how much the patient eats, often resulting in severe obesity. Caregivers need to strictly limit the patients' access to food, usually by installing locks on refrigerators and on all closets and cabinets where food is stored. It is the most common genetic cause of morbid obesity in children. Currently, no consensus exists as to the cause for this symptom, although genetic abnormalities in chromosome 15 disrupt the normal functioning of the hypothalamus. Given that the hypothalamic arcuate nucleus regulates many basic processes, including appetite, a link may well exist. In the hypothalamus, nerve cells that produce oxytocin, a hormone thought to contribute to satiety, are believed to be abnormal in people with PWS.

People with PWS have high ghrelin levels, which are thought to contribute directly to the increased appetite, hyperphagia, and obesity seen in this syndrome. Cassidy states the need for a clear delineation of behavioral expectations, the reinforcement of behavioural limits, and the establishment of regular routines.

The main mental health difficulties experienced by people with PWS include compulsive behaviour (usually manifested in skin picking) and anxiety. Psychiatric symptoms, for example, hallucinations, paranoia and depression, have been described in some cases and affect about 5–10% of young adults. Patients are often extremely stubborn and prone to anger. Psychiatric and behavioural problems are the most common cause of hospitalization.

Typically, 70–90% of affected individuals develop behavioral patterns in early childhood. Aspects of these patterns can include stubbornness, temper tantrums, controlling and manipulative behavior, difficulty with change in routine, and compulsive-like behaviors.

=== Endocrine ===
Several aspects of PWS support the concept of a growth hormone deficiency. Specifically, individuals with PWS are obese with short stature, abnormal body composition, reduced fat-free mass, reduced lean body mass and total energy expenditure, and decreased bone density. PWS is characterized by hypogonadism. This is manifested as undescended testes in males and benign premature adrenarche in females. Testes may descend with time or can be managed with surgery or testosterone replacement. Adrenarche may be treated with hormone replacement therapy.

=== Ophthalmologic ===
PWS is commonly associated with the development of strabismus. In one study, over 50% of patients had strabismus, mainly esotropia.

Some individuals (often those with deletions) may have hypopigmented fundi due to OCA2 haploinsufficiency.

== Genetics ==
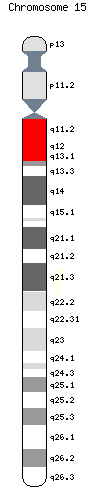

PWS is related to an epigenetic phenomenon known as imprinting. Normally, a fetus inherits an imprinted maternal copy of PW genes and a functional paternal copy of PW genes. Due to imprinting, the maternally inherited copies of these genes are virtually silent, and the fetus therefore relies on the expression of the paternal copies of the genes. In PWS, however, there is mutation/deletion of the paternal copies of PW genes, leaving the fetus with no functioning PW genes. The PW genes are the SNRPN and NDN genes, along with clusters of snoRNAs: SNORD64, SNORD107, SNORD108 and two copies of SNORD109, 29 copies of SNORD116 (HBII-85) and 48 copies of SNORD115 (HBII-52). These genes are located on chromosome 15, located in the region 15q11-13. This so-called PWS/AS region in the paternal chromosome 15 may be lost by one of several genetic mechanisms, which in the majority of instances occurs through chance mutation. Other, less common mechanisms include uniparental disomy, sporadic mutations, chromosome translocations, and gene deletions.

Region 15q11-13 is implicated in both PWS and Angelman syndrome (AS). While PWS results from the loss of PW genes within this region on the paternal chromosome, loss of a different gene (UBE3A) within the same region on the maternal chromosome causes AS. PWS and AS represent the first reported instances of disorders related to imprinting in humans.

The risk to the sibling of an affected child of having PWS depends on the genetic mechanism that caused the disorder. The risk to siblings is <1% if the affected child has a gene deletion or uniparental disomy, up to 50% if the affected child has a mutation of the imprinting control region, and up to 25% if a parental chromosomal translocation is present. Prenatal testing is possible for any of the known genetic mechanisms.

A microdeletion in one family of the snoRNA HBII-52 has excluded it from playing a major role in the disease.

Studies of human and mouse model systems have shown deletion of the 29 copies of the C/D box snoRNA SNORD116 (HBII-85) to be the primary cause of PWS.

== Diagnosis ==
It is traditionally characterized by hypotonia, short stature, hyperphagia, obesity, behavioral issues (specifically obsessive–compulsive disorder-like behaviors), small hands and feet, hypogonadism, and mild intellectual disability. However, with early diagnosis and early treatment (such as with growth hormone therapy), the prognosis for persons with PWS is beginning to change. Like autism, PWS is a spectrum disorder and symptoms can range from mild to severe and may change throughout the person's lifetime. Various organ systems are affected.

Traditionally, PWS was diagnosed by clinical presentation. Currently, the syndrome is diagnosed through genetic testing; testing is recommended for newborns with pronounced hypotonia. Early diagnosis of PWS allows for early intervention and the early prescription of growth hormone. Daily recombinant growth hormone (GH) injections are indicated for children with PWS. GH supports linear growth and increased muscle mass, and may lessen food preoccupation and weight gain.

The mainstay of diagnosis is genetic testing, specifically DNA-based methylation testing to detect the absence of the paternally contributed PWS/AS region on chromosome 15q11.2-q13. Such testing detects over 99% of cases. Methylation-specific testing is important to confirm the diagnosis of PWS in all individuals, but especially those who are too young to manifest sufficient features to make the diagnosis on clinical grounds or in those individuals who have atypical findings.

PWS is often misdiagnosed due to its unfamiliarity in the medical community. Sometimes it is misdiagnosed as Down syndrome, simply because of the relative frequency of Down syndrome compared to PWS.

== Treatment ==
While PWS has no cure, several treatments are available to lessen the condition's symptoms. During infancy, subjects should undergo therapies to improve muscle strength. Speech and occupational therapy are also indicated. During the school years, children benefit from a highly structured learning environment and extra help. The largest problem associated with the syndrome is severe obesity. Access to food must be strictly supervised and limited, usually by installing locks on all food-storage places, including refrigerators. Physical activity in individuals with PWS for all ages is needed to optimize strength and promote a healthy lifestyle.

An intranasal formulation of betahistine dihydrochloride received orphan drug designation from the US Food and Drug Administration (FDA) for the treatment of obesity associated with Prader–Willi syndrome.

In March 2025, the FDA approved a drug, to be called diazoxide choline, that treats the acute hunger that is a symptom of PWS.

Prescription of daily recombinant growth hormone injections is indicated for children with PWS. GH supports linear growth and increased muscle mass, and may lessen food preoccupation and weight gain.

Because of severe obesity, obstructive sleep apnea is a common sequela, and a positive airway pressure machine is often needed. A person who has been diagnosed with PWS may have to undergo surgical procedures. One surgery that has proven to be unsuccessful for treating obesity is the gastric bypass procedure.

Behavior and psychiatric problems should be detected early for the best results. These issues are best treated with parental education and training. Sometimes medication is introduced as well. Serotonin agonists have been most effective in lessening temper tantrums and improving compulsivity.

== Epidemiology ==
PWS affects between 1 in 10,000 to 30,000 people worldwide. The condition is named after Swiss physicians Andrea Prader and Heinrich Willi who, together with Alexis Labhart, described it in detail in 1956. An earlier description was made in 1887 by British physician John Langdon Down.

== Society and culture ==
Despite its rarity, PWS has been often referenced in popular culture, partly due to curiosity surrounding the insatiable appetite and the obesity symptomatic of the syndrome.

The International Prader–Willi Syndrome Organisation (IPWSO) is the umbrella organisation for people with PWS, their families, and those that work with them. It is made up of 41 different member associations, and has contacts in 120 countries, and was founded by Jean Phillips-Martinsson in 1991.

Katie Price's son, Harvey, is one well-known person with PWS.

The syndrome has been depicted and documented several times on television. A fictional individual with PWS featured in the episode "Dog Eat Dog" of the television series CSI: Crime Scene Investigation, which aired in the US on 24 November 2005. In July 2007, Channel 4 aired a 2006 documentary called Can't Stop Eating, surrounding the everyday lives of two people with PWS, Joe and Tamara. In a 2010 episode of Extreme Makeover: Home Edition, Sheryl Crow helped Ty Pennington rebuild a home for a family whose youngest son, Ethan Starkweather, was living with the syndrome. In a 2010 episode of Mystery Diagnosis on the Discovery Health channel, Conor Heybach, who has Prader–Willi syndrome, shared how he was diagnosed with it.

== See also ==
- Epigenetics
- Genomic imprinting
- List of investigational Prader–Willi syndrome drugs
- ROHHAD
- Schaaf–Yang syndrome, also known as 'Prader–Willi syndrome due to point mutation'
- Smith–Magenis syndrome
- Temple syndrome
- Chromosomal deletion syndrome
- Microdeletion syndrome
