= Small nucleolar RNA SNORD116 =

Non-coding RNA molecule involved in Prader–Willi syndrome

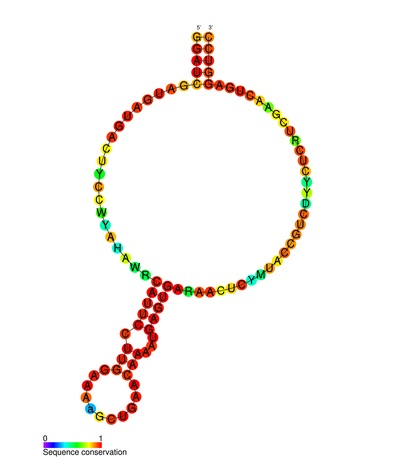
- Predicted secondary structure and sequence conservation of SNORD116

Identifiers
- Symbol: SNORD116
- Alt. Symbols: snoHBII-85; HBII-85
- Rfam: RF00108

Other data
- RNA type: Gene; snRNA; snoRNA; CD-box
- Domain: Eukaryota
- GO: GO:0006396 GO:0005730
- SO: SO:0000593
- PDB structures: PDBe

In molecular biology, SNORD116 (also known as HBII-85) is a non-coding RNA (ncRNA) molecule which functions in the modification of other small nuclear RNAs (snRNAs). This type of modifying RNA is usually located in the nucleolus of the eukaryotic cell which is a major site of snRNA biogenesis. It is known as a small nucleolar RNA (snoRNA) and also often referred to as a guide RNA.

SNORD116 belongs to the C/D box class of snoRNAs which contain the conserved sequence motifs known as the C box (UGAUGA) and the D box (CUGA). Most of the members of the box C/D family function in directing site-specific 2'-O-methylation of substrate RNAs.

In the human genome, there are 29 tandemnly repeated copies of SNORD116, followed by 48 copies of another C/D box snoRNA, SNORD115, in the Prader–Willi syndrome (PWS) region of chromosome 15. Unlike most other snoRNAs, SNORD116 is expressed prevalently in the brain (but is absent in PWS patients) and lacks any significant complementarity with ribosomal RNA. Mouse models of PWS show similar symptoms to humans (hyperphagia and growth deficiency), providing further evidence that PWS is directly linked to the deletion of SNORD116.

More evidence comes from the discovery of two individuals that share many traits of PWS sufferers, both have atypical microdeletions on chromosome 15q11–13, the intersection of which contains only the SNORD116 snoRNAs.

The targets of SNORD116 are unknown, however a bioinformatic screen located 23 possible targets within protein-coding genes, of these a large fraction were found to be alternatively spliced, suggesting a role of SNORD116 in the regulation of alternative splicing.
