= Overdominance =

Phenomenon in genetics

Overdominance is a phenomenon in genetics where the phenotype of the heterozygote lies outside the phenotypical range of both homozygous parents. Overdominance can also be described as heterozygote advantage regulated by a single genomic locus, wherein heterozygous individuals have a higher fitness than homozygous individuals. However, not all cases of the heterozygote advantage are considered overdominance, as they may be regulated by multiple genomic regions. Overdominance has been hypothesized as an underlying cause for heterosis (increased fitness of hybrid offspring).

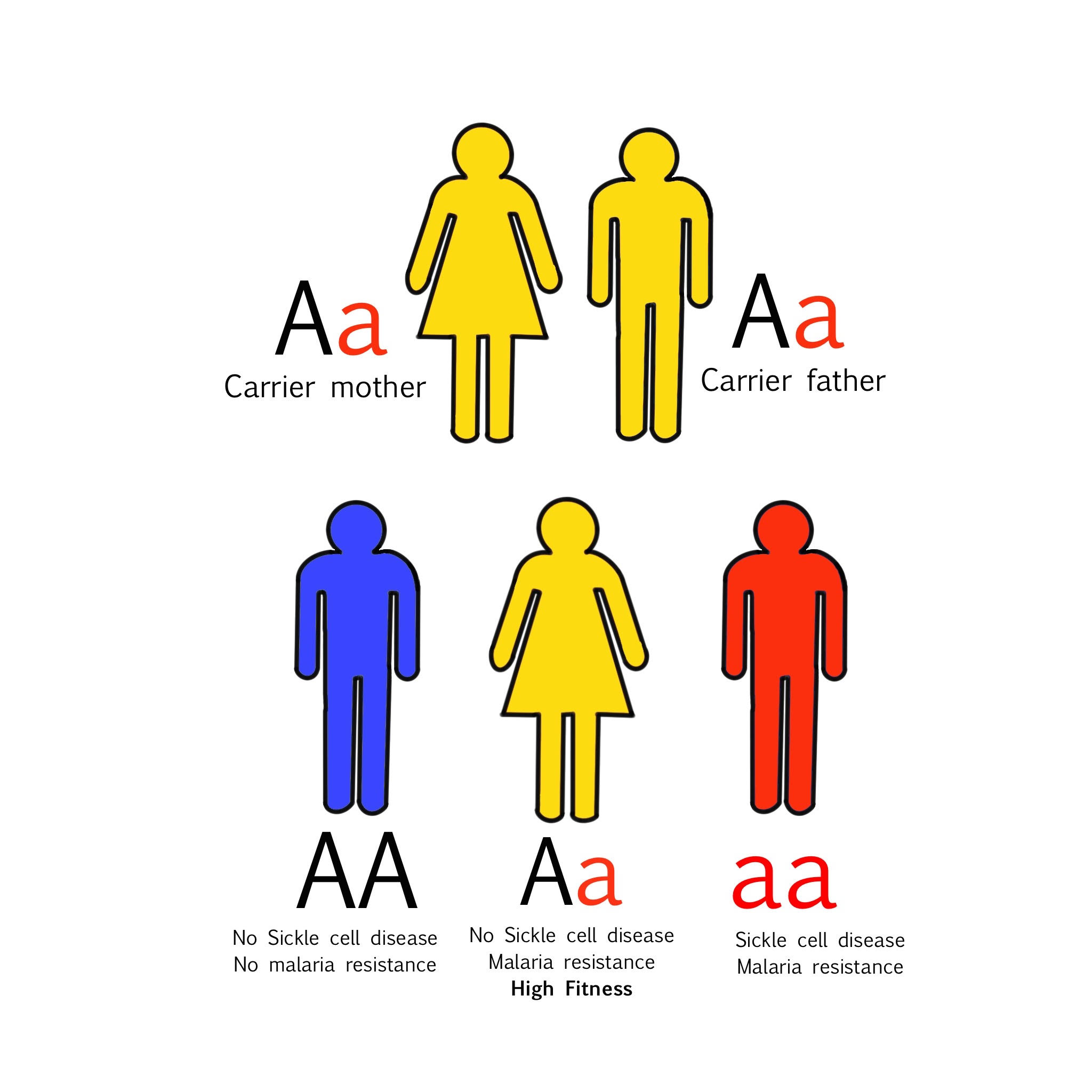
Sickle cell anemia overdominance

== Examples ==
=== Sickle cell anemia ===
An example of overdominance in humans is that of the sickle cell anemia. This condition is determined by a single polymorphism. Possessors of the deleterious allele have lower life expectancy, with homozygotes rarely reaching 50 years of age. However, this allele also yields some resistance to malaria. Thus in regions where malaria exerts or has exerted a strong selective pressure, sickle cell anemia has been selected for its conferred partial resistance to the disease. While homozygotes will have either no protection from malaria or a dramatic propensity to sickle cell anemia, heterozygotes have fewer physiological effects and a partial resistance to malaria.

=== Salmonoid major histocompatibility complex ===
Major histocompatibility complex (MHC) genes exhibit extensive variation, generally attributed to the notion of heterozygous individuals identifying a wider range of peptides than homozygous individuals. In arctic char population in Finland, fish heterozygous for MHC alleles had fewer cysts, grew larger, and had a better chance at survival, all indicating a higher fitness of the heterozygotes.

=== Gymnadenia rhellicani colour polymorphism ===
In Gymnadenia rhellicani, flower pigmentation is controlled by changes to amino acids 612 and 663 in GrMYB1, which plays a role in anthocyanin pigment production. Red flowers, heterozygous with black and white alleles, maintain a reproductive fitness advantage over white and black varieties presumably because they attract both bee and fly pollinator populations. Since the emergence of the white allele, the frequency of the red phenotype has been increasing in wild populations in multiple regions of the alps.

== Polar overdominance ==
Polar overdominance is a type of overdominance where either only the paternal or maternal allele is being synthesized in the offspring. An example of this was illustrated by a famous ram named Solid Gold and his offspring. This ram was known for its callipyge phenotype (pronounced muscular features and hindquarters) caused by a mutated allele, but only 15% of its offspring received these same traits. Solid Gold’s offspring only expressed the same callipyge phenotype if they inherited the mutated allele from Solid Gold and a wildtype allele from their mother, which would result in a C^{pat}/N^{mat} genotype. Offspring with genotypes such as: C^{pat}/C^{mat}, N^{pat}/N^{mat}, and N^{pat}/C^{mat} did not express the callipyge phenotype.

== Gillespie convention ==
Population Geneticist John H. Gillespie established the following convention (which however is not applicable when the homozygotes have equal fitness):

| Genotype: | A_{1}A_{1} | A_{1}A_{2} | A_{2}A_{2} |
| Relative fitness: | 1 | 1-hs | 1-s |

Where h is the heterozygote effect and s is the recessive allele effect. Thus given a value for s (i.e.: 0<s<1), h can yield the following information:

| h=0 | A_{1} dominant, A_{2} recessive |
| h=1 | A_{2} dominant, A_{1} recessive |
| 0<h<1 | incomplete dominance |
| h<0 | overdominance |
| h>1 | Underdominance |

For the case of sickle cell anemia the situation corresponds to the case h<0 in the Gillespie Model.

== See also ==
- Dominance versus overdominance
- Polar overdominance
- Underdominance
- Outbreeding depression
