= MEG3 =

Identifiers
- Aliases: MEG3, FP504, GTL2, LINC00023, NCRNA00023, PRO0518, PRO2160, prebp1, onco-lncRNA-83, maternally expressed 3 (non-protein coding), maternally expressed 3
- External IDs: OMIM: 605636; GeneCards: MEG3

Gene location (Human)
Chr.	Chromosome 14 (human)
Band	14q32.2	Start	100,779,410 bp
Band	14q32.2	End	100,861,031 bp
RNA expression pattern
Bgee	Human / Mouse (ortholog); Top expressed in: right hemisphere of cerebellum; anterior pituitary; right adrenal gland; adrenal cortex; left adrenal cortex; right adrenal cortex; right frontal lobe; primary visual cortex; nucleus accumbens; left ovary / n/a; More reference expression data
BioGPS	n/a
Orthologs
Databases	NCBI: entry; OMA: entry
Species	Human	Mouse
Entrez	55384	n/a
Ensembl	ENSG00000214548	n/a
UniProt	n a	n/a
RefSeq (mRNA)	NM_018514	n/a
RefSeq (protein)	n/a	n/a
Location (UCSC)	Chr 14: 100.78 – 100.86 Mb	n/a
PubMed search		n/a
- Wikidata
View/Edit Human

MEG3 (maternally expressed 3) is a maternally expressed, imprinted long non-coding RNA gene.

== Gene ==
MEG3 is a genomically imprinted, maternally expressed long non-coding RNA (lncRNA) gene located within the DLK1-MEG3 imprinted locus on human chromosome 14q32.3, paired with the paternally expressed protein-coding gene DLK1 in the same domain. The gene generates multiple alternatively spliced transcripts, all of which are non-coding, and is expressed across many normal tissues.

At least 12 different isoforms of MEG3 are generated by alternative splicing.

The non-Mendelian inheritance pattern, known as polar overdominance, likely results from the combination of the cis-effect on the expression levels of genes in the DLK1-GTL2 imprinted domain, and trans interaction between the products of reciprocally imprinted genes.

== Function ==
In mouse models, maternal deletion of Meg3 causes skeletal muscle defects and perinatal death, indicating a role in normal tissue development.

Meg3 constrains angiogenesis under normal conditions. Its loss increases expression of angiogenesis-promoting genes and microvessel formation in the brain, indicating that MEG3 normally restrains new blood vessel formation. MEG3 supports normal endothelial cell function by regulating the DNA damage response, contributing to vascular integrity.

MEG3 forms RNA–DNA triplex structures at GA-rich chromatin sites, acting as a molecular adaptor that guides PRC2/EZH2 to target genes such as those of the TGF-β pathway.

MEG3 is involved in negative regulation of cell growth under normal conditions, indicating that healthy tissues rely on baseline MEG3 activity to keep proliferation properly restrained.

== Clinical significance ==
=== Cancer ===
MEG3 expression is lost or reduced, frequently through promoter hypermethylation, in an expanding list of primary human tumors and cancer cell lines across many tissue types, making it one of the first lncRNAs identified as a tumor suppressor.

It acts as a growth suppressor in tumour cells, and activates p53. A conserved pseudoknot in exon 3 was shown to be essential for p53 pathway upregulation.

MEG3 normally stabilizes and increases p53 protein levels and enhances transcription of p53 target genes; its loss removes this brake on proliferation and apoptosis resistance. MEG3 loss de-represses RB, MYC, and PTEN regulation and the Wnt/β-catenin, PI3K/AKT, JAK/STAT, and VEGF pathways, permitting uncontrolled proliferation, epithelial–mesenchymal transition, and angiogenesis. MEG3 normally sequesters specific microRNAs (e.g., miR-21, miR-127, miR-421); its loss releases these oncogenic miRNAs to silence tumor-suppressive targets.

Low or absent MEG3 expression correlates with faster tumor growth, earlier metastasis, worse prognosis, and reduced chemosensitivity (e.g., to cisplatin, paclitaxel, oxaliplatin, and gemcitabine).

Specific MEG3 polymorphisms (rs7158663, rs4081134, rs11160608) are associated with increased cancer risk, and rs10132552 with therapeutic response.

MEG3 dysregulation has been implicated as a mechanism in cancers driven by exposure to carcinogenic metals.

Loss of MEG3 expression is strongly associated with tumor grade in meningioma, with allelic loss and promoter hypermethylation of MEG3 increasing in prevalence in higher-grade tumors.

=== Developmental abnormalities ===
The expression profile in mouse of the co-regulated Meg3 and Dlk1 genes suggests a causative role in the pathologies found in uniparental disomy animals, characterized by defects in skeletal muscle maturation, bone formation, placenta size and organization and prenatal lethality. The sheep homolog is associated with the callipyge mutation which in heterozygous individuals affects a muscle-specific long-range control element located in the DLK1-GTL2 intergenic region and results in the callipyge muscular hypertrophy.

=== Alzheimer's disease ===
MEG3 is thought to play a role in the development of Alzheimer's disease by triggering necroptosis.

== See also ==
- Long noncoding RNA
