= Underdominance =

Case where being homozygous for a set of alleles is advantageous

In genetics, underdominance, also known as homozygote advantage, heterozygote disadvantage, or negative overdominance," is the opposite of overdominance. It is the selection against the heterozygote, causing disruptive selection and divergent genotypes. Underdominance exists in situations where the heterozygotic genotype is inferior in fitness to either the dominant or recessive homozygotic genotype. Compared to examples of overdominance in actual populations, underdominance is considered more unstable and may lead to the fixation of either allele.

An example of stable underdominance may occur in individuals who are heterozygotic for polymorphisms that would make them better suited for one of two niches. Consider a situation in which a population is completely homozygotic for an "A" allele, allowing exploitation of a particular resource. Eventually, a polymorphic "a" allele may be introduced into the population, resulting in an individual who is capable of exploiting a different resource. This would result in an "aa" homozygotic invasion of the population due to nonexistent competition of the unexploited resource. The frequency of "aa" individuals would increase until the abundance of the "a" resource begins to decline. Eventually, the "AA" and "aa" genotypes would reach equilibrium with each other, with "Aa" heterozygotic individuals potentially experiencing a reduced fitness compared to those individuals who are homozygotic for utilization of either resource. This example of underdominance is stable because any shift in equilibrium would result in selection for the rare allele due to increased resource abundance. This compensatory selection would ultimately return the dimorphic system to underdominant equilibrium.

== Incidence in butterfly populations ==
An example of stable underdominance can be found in the African butterfly species Pseudacraea eurytus, which utilizes Batesian mimicry to escape predation. This species possesses two alleles which each confer an appearance similar to that of another local butterfly species that is toxic to its predator. Individuals who are heterozygous for this trait appear to be intermediate in appearance and thus experience increased predation and lowered overall fitness.

== Uses in pest control ==
Models of stable underdominance have shown potential in driving the introduction of refractory genes into pest populations that are responsible for the spread of infective diseases such as malaria and dengue fever. A refractory gene alone would not have higher fitness than the native genes, but engineered underdominance may prove effective as a mechanism to spread such a gene. In this model, two genetics constructs are introduced into two non-homologous chromosomes. Each construct is lethal when expressed individually but can be suppressed by the other construct. In this way, individuals with only one of the two constructed genes (heterozygotes) are selected against, but homozygotes with both or neither construct are genetically healthy. Analysis of this model using simple population genetics shows that successful spread of refractory genes using this engineered underdominance is possible with relatively small release of the constructed genotype into the population.

A similar system of manipulation of pest populations was achieved in a population of Drosophila melanogaster by using a knock-down/rescue system. The genetic construct in this system employs a dsRNAi knockdown of a C-reactive protein, RpL14, as well as a rescue element (a complete copy of the wild type RpL14 gene). Individuals that are heterozygous for this construct experience lowered fitness due to limited restoration of the RpL14 gene, which results in reduced female fertility and delayed development, along with various other mutations that ultimately lower fitness by 70-80%. This system of underdominance allowed manipulation of the population and ultimate fixation of the constructed genotype and has potential applications in a number of settings, including agriculture and the reduction of various pest-carried diseases.

== See also ==
- Natural selection
- Disruptive selection
- Heterozygote advantage
- Population genetics
