= Jean Phillips-Martinsson =

British disability advocate (1930–2026)

- Born: Jean Phillips; 11 April 1930
- Died: 28 September 2026 (aged 96); London, England
- Spouse: Sven Martinsson
- Children: Anders

Jean Phillips Martinsson (11 April 1930 – 28 September 2026) was a British parent, living in Sweden, who founded the Swedish Prader-Willi Syndrome Association in 1986. In 1991, she became the founding president of the International Prader-Willi Syndrome Organisation.

== Career ==
Phillips's son, Anders, was diagnosed with PWS at age 14. In 1986, two years after his diagnosis, she founded the Swedish Prader Willi Association. After founding the International Prader Willi Syndrome Organisation (IPWSO), she remained its president until 1998.

== Personal life ==
In 2008 her husband, Sven Martinsson, died.

In 2019 her son, Anders, died aged 49.
