= YTHDF1 =

Protein-coding gene in humans

Available structures
PDB	Ortholog search: PDBe RCSB
PDB	List of PDB id codes 4RCI, 4RCJ

Identifiers
- Aliases: YTHDF1, C20orf21, YTH N6-methyladenosine RNA binding protein 1, DF1
- External IDs: OMIM: 616529; MGI: 1917431; HomoloGene: 9844; GeneCards: YTHDF1; OMA:YTHDF1 - orthologs

Gene location (Human)
Chr.	Chromosome 20 (human)
Band	20q13.33	Start	63,195,429 bp
Band	20q13.33	End	63,216,139 bp

Gene location (Mouse)
Chr.	Chromosome 2 (mouse)
Band	2|2 H4	Start	180,546,170 bp
Band	2|2 H4	End	180,562,742 bp
RNA expression pattern
Bgee	Human / Mouse (ortholog); Top expressed in: secondary oocyte; tendon of biceps brachii; middle temporal gyrus; internal globus pallidus; cerebellar vermis; tibia; pancreatic epithelial cell; tibialis anterior muscle; beta cell; Brodmann area 23 / Top expressed in: Paneth cell; primitive streak; condyle; fossa; renal corpuscle; internal carotid artery; motor neuron; medullary collecting duct; external carotid artery; facial motor nucleus; More reference expression data
BioGPS	n/a
Gene ontology
Molecular function	ribosome binding; N6-methyladenosine-containing RNA binding; RNA binding; protein binding
Cellular component	cytoplasm
Biological process	positive regulation of translational initiation; positive regulation of translation
Sources:Amigo / QuickGO
Orthologs
Species	Human	Mouse
Entrez	54915	228994
Ensembl	ENSG00000149658	ENSMUSG00000038848
UniProt	Q9BYJ9	P59326
RefSeq (mRNA)	NM_017798	NM_173761
RefSeq (protein)	NP_060268	NP_776122
Location (UCSC)	Chr 20: 63.2 – 63.22 Mb	Chr 2: 180.55 – 180.56 Mb
PubMed search
- Wikidata
View/Edit Human	View/Edit Mouse

YTH domain family, member 1 is a protein that in humans is encoded by the YTHDF1 gene.

== See also ==
N^{6}-Methyladenosine
