= Small nucleolar RNA SNORD115 =

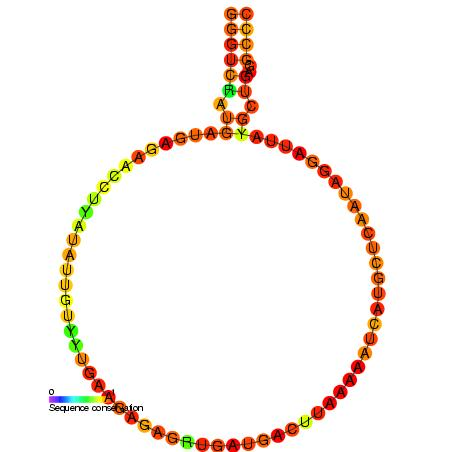
- Predicted secondary structure and sequence conservation of SNORD115

Identifiers
- Symbol: SNORD115
- Alt. Symbols: snoHBII-52; HBII-52
- Rfam: RF00105

Other data
- RNA type: Gene; snRNA; snoRNA; CD-box
- Domain: Eukaryota
- GO: GO:0006396 GO:0005730
- SO: SO:0000593
- PDB structures: PDBe

In molecular biology, SNORD115 (also known as HBII-52) is a non-coding RNA (ncRNA) molecule known as a small nucleolar RNA which usually functions in guiding the modification of other non-coding RNAs. This type of modifying RNA is usually located in the nucleolus of the eukaryotic cell which is a major site of snRNA biogenesis. HBII-52 refers to the human gene, whereas RBII-52 is used for the rat gene and MBII-52 is used for naming the mouse gene.

HBII-52 belongs to the C/D box class of snoRNAs which contain the conserved sequence motifs known as the C box (UGAUGA) and the D box (CUGA). Most of the members of the box C/D family function in directing site-specific 2'-O-methylation of substrate RNAs.

In the human genome, HBII-52 is encoded in a tandemly repeated array with another C/D box snoRNA, HBII-85 (SNORD116), in the Prader-Willi syndrome (PWS) region of chromosome 15. However, a microdeletion in one family of the snoRNA HBII-52 cluster has excluded it from playing a major role in the disease. HBII-52 is found in 47 tandem near identical copies on human chromosome 15q11-13. This locus is maternally imprinted, meaning that only the paternal copy of the locus is transcribed. HBII-52 is exclusively expressed in the brain but is absent in PWS patients. HBII-52 lacks any significant complementarity with ribosomal RNAs, but does have an 18 nucleotide region of conserved complementarity to serotonin 2C receptor mRNA. The serotonin 2C receptor is also expressed in the brain. It has been shown that this snoRNA is likely to bind to a silencing element of exon Vb increasing its inclusion and production of a functional spliceform of the serotonin 2C receptor.

The chromosomal locus containing the SNORD115 gene cluster has been duplicated in many individuals with autistic traits. A mouse model engineered to have a duplication of the SNORD115 cluster displays autistic-like behaviour.

There is evidence that a truncated form of MBII-52 (SNORD115 found in mouse) regulates the alternative splicing of the protein coding genes DPM2, TAF1, RALGPS1, PBRM1, and CRHR1.
