= METTL3 =

Gene encoding part of N6-adenosine-methyltransferase

Identifiers
- Aliases: METTL3, IME4, M6A, MT-A70, Spo8, methyltransferase like 3, hmethyltransferase 3, N6-adenosine-methyltransferase complex catalytic subunit
- External IDs: OMIM: 612472; MGI: 1927165; GeneCards: METTL3
Available structures
| PDB | Ortholog search: PDBe RCSB |
| PDB | List of PDB id codes 5IL0, 5IL2, 5IL1, 5K7M, 5K7U, 5K7W |
Enzyme activity
| EC # | BRENDA | ExPASy | KEGG | MetaCyc |
|---|---|---|---|---|
| 2.1.1.348 | ↗ | ↗ | ↗ | ↗ |

Gene location (Human)
| Chr. | Chromosome 14 (human) |
| Band | 14q11.2 | Start | 21,498,133 bp |
| Band | 14q11.2 | End | 21,511,342 bp |

Gene location (Mouse)
| Chr. | Chromosome 14 (mouse) |
| Band | 14|14 C2 | Start | 52,532,298 bp |
| Band | 14|14 C2 | End | 52,542,585 bp |
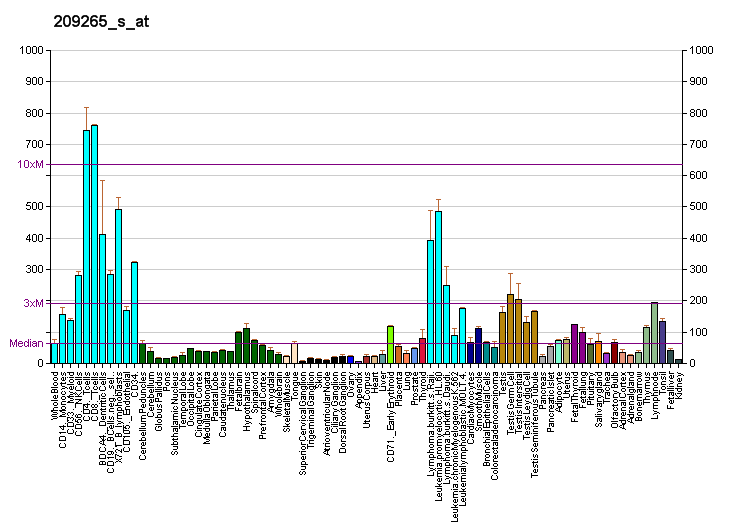
RNA expression pattern
| Bgee | Human / Mouse (ortholog); Top expressed in: right uterine tube; right hemisphere of cerebellum; body of uterus; left lobe of thyroid gland; left ovary; right ovary; right lobe of thyroid gland; body of pancreas; tibial nerve; canal of the cervix / Top expressed in: embryo; neural layer of retina; saccule; primary oocyte; Paneth cell; primitive streak; otic placode; embryo; epithelium of lens; facial motor nucleus; More reference expression data |
| BioGPS | More reference expression data |
Gene ontology
| Molecular function | methyltransferase activity; transferase activity; RNA binding; RNA methyltransferase activity; mRNA (2'-O-methyladenosine-N6-)-methyltransferase activity; mRNA binding; S-adenosyl-L-methionine binding; protein heterodimerization activity; protein binding; mRNA (N6-adenosine)-methyltransferase activity |
| Cellular component | RNA N6-methyladenosine methyltransferase complex; nucleoplasm; nuclear speck; nucleus; cytoplasm |
| Biological process | rhythmic process; mRNA processing; positive regulation of cap-independent translational initiation; stem cell population maintenance; methylation; mRNA methylation; mRNA destabilization; circadian rhythm; primary miRNA processing; adenosine to inosine editing; RNA methylation; mRNA splicing, via spliceosome; mRNA catabolic process; forebrain radial glial cell differentiation; cellular response to UV; gliogenesis; regulation of T cell differentiation; negative regulation of Notch signaling pathway; regulation of meiotic cell cycle; endothelial to hematopoietic transition; regulation of hematopoietic stem cell differentiation; cellular response to DNA damage stimulus; spermatogenesis; cell differentiation; dosage compensation by inactivation of X chromosome; RNA metabolic process |
Sources:Amigo / QuickGO
Orthologs
| Databases | NCBI: entry; OMA: entry |
| Species | Human | Mouse |
| Entrez | 56339 | 56335 |
| Ensembl | ENSG00000165819 | ENSMUSG00000022160 |
| UniProt | Q86U44 | Q8C3P7 |
| RefSeq (mRNA) | NM_019852 | NM_019721 |
| RefSeq (protein) | NP_062826 | NP_062695 |
| Location (UCSC) | Chr 14: 21.5 – 21.51 Mb | Chr 14: 52.53 – 52.54 Mb |
| PubMed search |
- Wikidata
| View/Edit Human | View/Edit Mouse |

N6-adenosine-methyltransferase 70 kDa subunit (METTL3) is an enzyme that in humans is encoded by the METTL3 gene. METTL3 is located on the human chromosome 14q11.2 (Cancer Biology) and out of the METTL protein family, it is the most studied.

This gene encodes the 70 kDa subunit of MT-A which is part of N6-adenosine-methyltransferase. This enzyme is involved in the post-transcriptional methylation of internal adenosine residues in eukaryotic mRNAs, forming N6-methyladenosine (m^{6}A). METTL3 forms the m^{6} a methyltransferase complex with METTL14 and WTP and is responsible for a majority of the m^{6}a modifications of mRNA. The most common modification being the catalyzation of m^{6}a with the methyltransferase complex. METTL3 is expressed in a variety of normal tissues, such as the lymphoid, testis, prostate and fallopian tube tissues. The enzyme is also responsible for mechanisms related to tumor development, RNA stability and maturation, and has suggested roles in ensuring animal survival.

== Function ==
=== The m^{6}A methyltransferase complex ===
In the m^{6}a methyltransferase complex (MTC), METTL3 is a part of the m^{6}A "writers" and is a core catalytic component. METTL3 interacts with S-adenosylmethionine (SAM), a methyl donor to catalyze the formation of the MTC complex via methyl transfer. METTL3 forms the heterodimer complex with METTL3, binds to SAM and interacts with substrate RNA to transfer methyl groups to target RNA. The complex can also bind to target RNA using WTAP. After a METTL3-METTL14-WTAP complex forms, METTL3 can bind to RBM15. Then, MTC can be recruited at specific sites in the RNA.

=== In cancer ===
METTL3 acts as an m6a methyltransferase in cancer, mostly as an oncogene, and sometimes a tumor suppressor. In most examples, METTL3 promotes the initiation and development of cancers such as lung, liver, gastric, prostate and breast cancer. METTL3 does so through applying m6a modifications on crucial mediators and transcripts. An example of this is METTL3 expression in pancreatic cancer. In pancreatic cancer, METTL3 expression applies m6a modifications onto the oncogene primary miR-25, provoking malignant transformation via enhanced maturation of the miRNA.

In a few cases, METTL3 acts as a tumor suppressor. The m6a mRNA modifications from METTL3 can promote tumor suppressor proliferation, migration, and invasion. In colorectal cancer, METTL3 promotes the tumor suppressor through p38/ERK pathways.
