= YTHDF2 =

Protein-coding gene in humans

Available structures
PDB	Ortholog search: PDBe RCSB
PDB	List of PDB id codes 4RDN, 4RDO, 4WQN

Identifiers
- Aliases: YTHDF2, HGRG8, NY-REN-2, CAHL, YTH N6-methyladenosine RNA binding protein 2, DF2
- External IDs: OMIM: 610640; MGI: 2444233; HomoloGene: 32302; GeneCards: YTHDF2; OMA:YTHDF2 - orthologs

Gene location (Human)
Chr.	Chromosome 1 (human)
Band	1p35.3	Start	28,736,621 bp
Band	1p35.3	End	28,769,775 bp

Gene location (Mouse)
Chr.	Chromosome 4 (mouse)
Band	4|4 D2.3	Start	131,912,223 bp
Band	4|4 D2.3	End	131,939,614 bp
RNA expression pattern
Bgee	Human / Mouse (ortholog); Top expressed in: gonad; cerebellar vermis; quadriceps femoris muscle; ganglionic eminence; islet of Langerhans; stromal cell of endometrium; bone marrow cell; olfactory zone of nasal mucosa; skin of abdomen; ventricular zone / Top expressed in: maxillary prominence; medial ganglionic eminence; mandibular prominence; hand; abdominal wall; cumulus cell; endocardial cushion; vas deferens; somite; epiblast; More reference expression data
BioGPS	n/a
Gene ontology
Molecular function	N6-methyladenosine-containing RNA binding; protein binding; RNA binding
Cellular component	cytosol; P-body; nucleus; cytoplasm; microtubule organizing center; cytoplasmic ribonucleoprotein granule
Biological process	humoral immune response; positive regulation of cap-independent translational initiation; regulation of mRNA stability; embryonic morphogenesis; mRNA destabilization; oocyte maturation; negative regulation of Notch signaling pathway; endothelial to hematopoietic transition; regulation of hematopoietic stem cell differentiation; regulation of meiotic cell cycle process involved in oocyte maturation; cell differentiation; oogenesis
Sources:Amigo / QuickGO
Orthologs
Species	Human	Mouse
Entrez	51441	213541
Ensembl	ENSG00000198492	ENSMUSG00000040025
UniProt	Q9Y5A9	Q91YT7
RefSeq (mRNA)	NM_016258; NM_001172828; NM_001173128	NM_145393
RefSeq (protein)	NP_001166299; NP_001166599; NP_057342	NP_663368
Location (UCSC)	Chr 1: 28.74 – 28.77 Mb	Chr 4: 131.91 – 131.94 Mb
PubMed search
- Wikidata
View/Edit Human	View/Edit Mouse

YTH N6-methyladenosine RNA binding protein 2 is a protein that in humans is encoded by the YTHDF2 gene.

== Function ==
This gene encodes a member of the YTH (YT521-B homology) superfamily containing YTH domain. The YTH domain is typical for the eukaryotes and is particularly abundant in plants. The YTH domain is usually located in the middle of the protein sequence and may function in binding to RNA. In addition to a YTH domain, this protein has a proline-rich region which may be involved in signal transduction. An Alu-rich domain has been identified in one of the introns of this gene, which is thought to be associated with human longevity. Also, reciprocal translocations between this gene and the Runx1 (AML1) gene on chromosome 21 has been observed in patients with acute myeloid leukemia. This gene was initially mapped to chromosome 14, which was later turned out to be a pseudogene. Alternatively, spliced transcript variants encoding different isoforms have been identified in this gene. [provided by RefSeq, Oct 2012].

== See also ==
N^{6}-Methyladenosine
