= Heterozygote advantage =

Case in which having two different versions of a gene provides an advantage

A heterozygote advantage describes the case in which the heterozygous genotype has a higher relative fitness than either the homozygous dominant or homozygous recessive genotype. Loci exhibiting heterozygote advantage are a small minority of loci. The specific case of heterozygote advantage due to a single locus is known as overdominance. Overdominance is a rare condition in genetics where the phenotype of the heterozygote lies outside of the phenotypical range of both homozygote parents, and heterozygous individuals have a higher fitness than homozygous individuals.

Polymorphism can be maintained by selection favoring the heterozygote, and this mechanism is used to explain the occurrence of some kinds of genetic variability. A common example is the case where the heterozygote conveys both advantages and disadvantages, while both homozygotes convey a disadvantage. A well-established case of heterozygote advantage is that of the gene involved in sickle cell anaemia.

Often, the advantages and disadvantages conveyed are rather complicated, because more than one gene may influence a given trait or morph. Major genes almost always have multiple effects (pleiotropism), which can simultaneously convey separate advantageous traits and disadvantageous traits upon the same organism. In this instance, the state of the organism's environment will provide selection, with a net effect either favoring or working in opposition to the gene, until an environmentally determined equilibrium is reached.

Heterozygote advantage is a major underlying mechanism for heterosis, or "hybrid vigor", which is the improved or increased function of any biological quality in a hybrid offspring. Previous research, comparing measures of dominance, overdominance and epistasis (mostly in plants), found that the majority of cases of heterozygote advantage were due to complementation (or dominance), the masking of deleterious recessive alleles by wild-type alleles, as discussed in the articles Heterosis and Complementation (genetics), but there were also findings of overdominance, especially in rice. More recent research, however, has established that there is also an epigenetic contribution to heterozygote advantage, primarily as determined in plants, though also reported in mice.

== In theory ==
When two populations of any sexual organism are separated and kept isolated from each other, the frequencies of deleterious mutations in the two populations will differ over time, by genetic drift. It is highly unlikely, however, that the same deleterious mutations will be common in both populations after a long period of separation. Since loss-of-function mutations tend to be recessive (given that dominant mutations of this type generally prevent the organism from reproducing and thereby passing the gene on to the next generation), the result of any cross between the two populations will be fitter than the parent.

This article deals with the specific case of fitness overdominance, where the fitness advantage of the cross is caused by being heterozygous at one specific locus alone.

== Experimental confirmation ==
Cases of both homozygote and heterozygote advantage have been demonstrated in several organisms, including humans. The first experimental confirmation of heterozygote advantage was with Drosophila melanogaster, a fruit fly that has been a model organism for genetic research. In a classic study on the ebony mutation, Kalmus demonstrated how polymorphism can persist in a population through heterozygote advantage.

If weakness were the only effect of the mutant allele, so it conveyed only disadvantages, natural selection would weed out this version of the gene until it became extinct from the population. However, the same mutation also conveyed advantages, providing improved viability for heterozygous individuals. The heterozygote expressed none of the disadvantages of homozygotes, yet gained improved viability. The homozygote wild type was perfectly healthy, but did not possess the improved viability of the heterozygote, and was thus at a disadvantage compared to the heterozygote in survival and reproduction.

This mutation, which at first glance appeared to be harmful, conferred enough of an advantage to heterozygotes to make it beneficial, so that it remained at dynamic equilibrium in the gene pool. Kalmus introduced flies with the ebony mutation to a wild-type population. The ebony allele persisted through many generations of flies in the study, at genotype frequencies that varied from 8% to 30%. In experimental populations, the ebony allele was more prevalent and therefore advantageous when flies were raised at low, dry temperatures, but less so in warm, moist environments.

Heterozygote disadvantage occurs when "a heterozygote has a lower overall fitness than either homozygote." Heterozygote disadvantage occurs in mammals, birds, and insects.

== In human genetics ==
=== Sickle-cell anemia ===
Sickle-cell anemia (SCA) is a genetic disorder caused by the presence of two incompletely recessive alleles. When a sufferer's red blood cells are exposed to low-oxygen conditions, the cells lose their healthy round shape and become sickle-shaped. This deformation of the cells can cause them to become lodged in capillaries, depriving other parts of the body of sufficient oxygen. When untreated, a person with SCA may suffer from painful periodic bouts, often causing damage to internal organs, strokes, or anemia. Typically, the disease results in premature death.

Possible advantage of being heterozygous for sickle cell anemia disease (A) vs. normal blood cell response (B) when infected with malaria.

Because the genetic disorder is incompletely recessive, a person with only one SCA allele and one unaffected allele will have a "mixed" phenotype: The sufferer will not experience the ill effects of the disease, yet will still possess a sickle cell trait, whereby some of the red blood cells undergo benign effects of SCA, but nothing severe enough to be harmful. Those afflicted with sickle-cell trait are also known as carriers: If two carriers have a child, there is a 25% chance their child will have SCA, a 50% chance their child will be a carrier, and a 25% chance that the child will neither have SCA nor be a carrier. Were the presence of the SCA allele to confer only negative traits, its allele frequency would be expected to decrease generation after generation, until its presence were eliminated by selection and by chance.

However, convincing evidence indicates, in areas with persistent malaria outbreaks, individuals with the heterozygous state have a distinct advantage (and this is why individuals with heterozygous alleles are far more common in these areas). Those with the benign sickle trait possess a resistance to malarial infection. The pathogen that causes the disease spends part of its cycle in the red blood cells and triggers an abnormal drop in oxygen levels in the cell. In carriers, this drop is sufficient to trigger the full sickle-cell reaction, which leads to infected cells being rapidly removed from circulation and strongly limiting the infection's progress. These individuals have a great resistance to infection and have a greater chance of surviving outbreaks. However, those with two alleles for SCA may survive malaria, but will typically die from their genetic disease unless they have access to advanced medical care. Those of the homozygous "normal" or wild-type case will have a greater chance of passing on their genes successfully, in that there is no chance of their offspring's suffering from SCA; yet, they are more susceptible to dying from malarial infection before they have a chance to pass on their genes.

This resistance to infection is the main reason the SCA allele and SCA disease still exist. It is found in greatest frequency in populations where malaria was and often still is a serious problem. Approximately one in 10 African Americans is a carrier, as their recent ancestry is from malaria-stricken regions. Other populations in Africa, India, the Mediterranean and the Middle East have higher allele frequencies, as well. As effective antimalarial treatment becomes increasingly available to malaria-stricken populations, the allele frequency for SCA is expected to decrease, so long as SCA treatments are unavailable or only partially effective. If effective sickle-cell anemia treatments become available to the same degree, allele frequencies should remain at their present levels in these populations. In this context, 'treatment effectiveness' refers to the reproductive fitness it grants, rather than the degree of suffering alleviation.

=== Cystic fibrosis ===
Cystic fibrosis (CF) is an autosomal recessive hereditary monogenic disease of the lungs, sweat glands and digestive system. The disorder is caused by the malfunction of the CFTR protein, which controls intermembrane transport of chloride ions, which is vital to maintaining equilibrium of water in the body. The malfunctioning protein causes viscous mucus to form in the lungs and intestinal tract. Before modern times, children born with CF would have a life expectancy of only a few years, but modern medicine has made it possible for these people to live into adulthood. However, even in these individuals, CF typically causes male infertility. It is the most common genetic disease among people of European descent.

The presence of a single CF mutation may influence survival of people affected by diseases involving loss of body fluids, typically due to diarrhea. The most common of these maladies is cholera, which only began killing Europeans millennia after the CF mutation frequency was already established in the population. Another such disease that CF may protect against is typhoid. Those with cholera would often die of dehydration due to intestinal water losses. A mouse model of CF was used to study resistance to cholera, and the results were published in Science in 1994 (Gabriel, et al.). The heterozygote (carrier) mouse had less secretory diarrhea than normal, noncarrier mice. Thus, it appeared for a time that resistance to cholera explained the selective advantage to being a carrier for CF and why the carrier state was so frequent.

This theory has been called into question. Hogenauer, et al. have challenged this popular theory with a human study. Prior data were based solely on mouse experiments. These authors found the heterozygote state was indistinguishable from the noncarrier state.

Another theory for the prevalence of the CF mutation is that it provides resistance to tuberculosis. Tuberculosis was responsible for 20% of all European deaths between 1600 and 1900, so even partial protection against the disease could account for the current gene frequency.

The most recent hypothesis, published in the Journal of Theoretical Biology, proposed having a single CF mutation granted respiratory advantage for early Europeans migrating north into the dusty wasteland left by the Last Glacial Maximum.

As of 2016, the selective pressure for the high gene prevalence of CF mutations is still uncertain, and may be due to an unbiased genetic drift rather than a selective advantage. Approximately one in 25 persons of European descent is a carrier of the disease, and one in 2500 to 3000 children born is affected by Cystic fibrosis.

=== Triosephosphate isomerase ===
Triosephosphate isomerase (TPI) is a central enzyme of glycolysis, the main pathway for cells to obtain energy by metabolizing sugars. In humans, certain mutations within this enzyme, which affect the dimerisation of this protein, are causal for a rare disease, triosephosphate isomerase deficiency. Other mutations, which inactivate the enzyme (= null alleles) are lethal when inherited homozygously (two defective copies of the TPI gene), but have no obvious effect in heterozygotes (one defective and one normal copy). However, the frequency of heterozygous null alleles is much higher than expected, indicating a heterozygous advantage for TPI null alleles. The reason is unknown; however, new scientific results are suggesting cells having reduced TPI activity are more resistant to oxidative stress.

=== Resistance to hepatitis C virus infection ===
There is evidence that genetic heterozygosity in humans provides increased resistance to certain viral infections. A significantly lower proportion of HLA-DRB1 heterozygosity exists among HCV-infected cases than uninfected cases. The differences were more pronounced with alleles represented as functional supertypes (P = 1.05 × 10^{−6}) than those represented as low-resolution genotypes (P = 1.99 × 10^{−3}). These findings constitute evidence that heterozygosity provides an advantage among carriers of different supertype HLA-DRB1 alleles against HCV infection progression to end-stage liver disease in a large-scale, long-term study population.

=== MHC heterozygosity and human scent preferences ===
Multiple studies have shown, in double-blind experiments, females prefer the scent of males who are heterozygous at all three MHC loci. The reasons proposed for these findings are speculative; however, it has been argued that heterozygosity at MHC loci results in more alleles to fight against a wider variety of diseases, possibly increasing survival rates against a wider range of infectious diseases. The latter claim has been tested in an experiment, which showed outbreeding mice to exhibit MHC heterozygosity enhanced their health and survival rates against multiple-strain infections.

=== BAFF and autoimmune disease ===
B-cell activating factor (BAFF) is a cytokine encoded by the TNFSF13B gene. A variant of the gene containing a deletion (GCTGT—>A) renders a shorter mRNA transcript that escapes degradation by microRNA, thus increasing expression of BAFF, which consequently up-regulates the humoral immune response. This variant is associated with systemic lupus erythematosus and multiple sclerosis, but heterozygote carriers of the variant have decreased susceptibility to malaria infection.

== See also ==
- Balanced polymorphism
- Hybrid vigour
- Miscegenation
- Overdominance
- Polymorphism (biology)
