= YTHDF3 =

Protein-coding gene in humans

Identifiers
- Aliases: YTHDF3, YTH N6-methyladenosine RNA binding protein 3, DF3
- External IDs: MGI: 1918850; HomoloGene: 34991; GeneCards: YTHDF3; OMA:YTHDF3 - orthologs

Gene location (Human)
Chr.	Chromosome 8 (human)
Band	8q12.3	Start	63,168,553 bp
Band	8q12.3	End	63,212,786 bp

Gene location (Mouse)
Chr.	Chromosome 3 (mouse)
Band	3|3 A1	Start	16,237,376 bp
Band	3|3 A1	End	16,271,201 bp
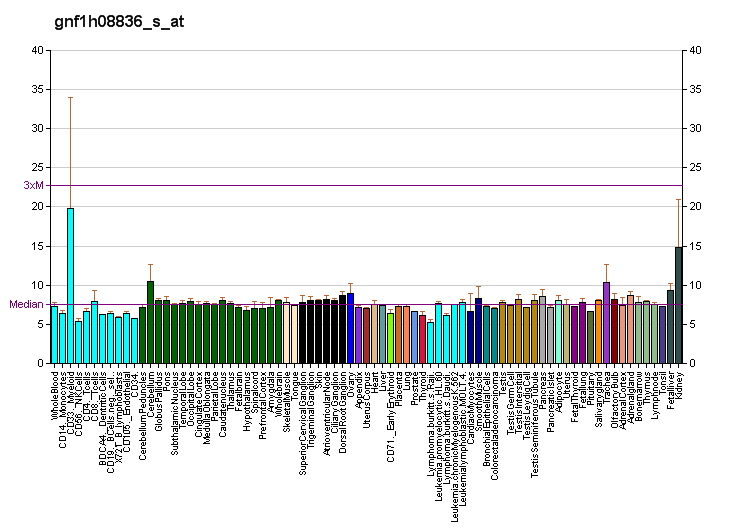

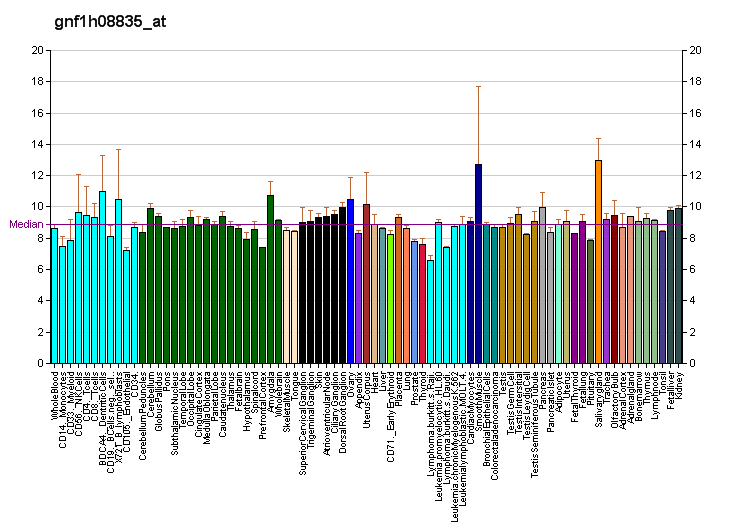
RNA expression pattern
Bgee	Human / Mouse (ortholog); Top expressed in: endothelial cell; germinal epithelium; Epithelium of choroid plexus; tibia; parietal pleura; superficial temporal artery; Skeletal muscle tissue of biceps brachii; visceral pleura; epithelium of nasopharynx; mucosa of paranasal sinus / Top expressed in: conjunctival fornix; embryonic cell; zygote; tail of embryo; migratory enteric neural crest cell; parotid gland; genital tubercle; secondary oocyte; cumulus cell; intercostal muscle; More reference expression data
BioGPS	More reference expression data
Gene ontology
Molecular function	protein binding; N6-methyladenosine-containing RNA binding; RNA binding; ribosome binding
Cellular component	cytoplasm; cytosol
Biological process	positive regulation of translation; positive regulation of translational initiation; mRNA destabilization
Sources:Amigo / QuickGO
Orthologs
Species	Human	Mouse
Entrez	253943	229096
Ensembl	ENSG00000185728	ENSMUSG00000047213
UniProt	Q7Z739	Q8BYK6
RefSeq (mRNA)	NM_001277813; NM_001277814; NM_001277815; NM_001277816; NM_001277817 NM_001277818; NM_152758	NM_001145919; NM_172677; NM_001358041; NM_001358042; NM_001358043
RefSeq (protein)	NP_001264742; NP_001264743; NP_001264744; NP_001264745; NP_001264746 NP_001264747; NP_689971	NP_001139391; NP_766265; NP_001344970; NP_001344971; NP_001344972
Location (UCSC)	Chr 8: 63.17 – 63.21 Mb	Chr 3: 16.24 – 16.27 Mb
PubMed search
- Wikidata
View/Edit Human	View/Edit Mouse

YTH domain family protein 3 is a protein that in humans is encoded by the YTHDF3 gene.

== See also ==
N^{6}-Methyladenosine
