= Small nucleolar RNA SNORD64 =

Small Nucleolar RNA SNORD64
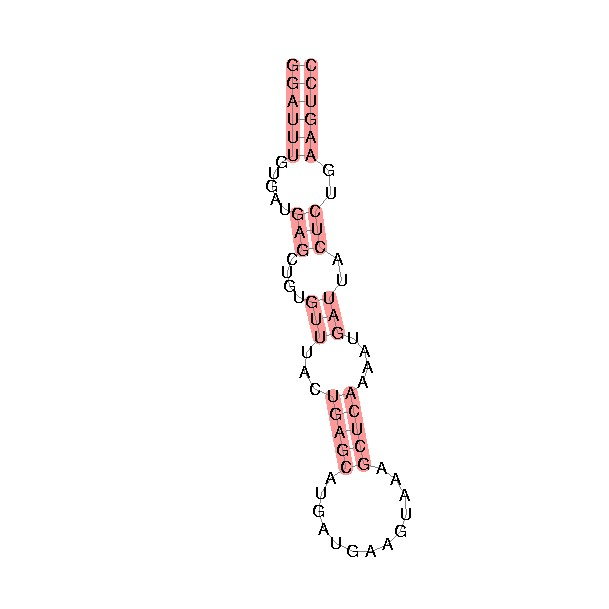
- Predicted secondary structure and sequence conservation of SNORD64

Identifiers
- Symbol: SNORD64
- Alt. Symbols: snoHBII-13
- Rfam: RF00570

Other data
- RNA type: Gene; snRNA; snoRNA; C/D-box
- Domain: Eukaryota
- GO: GO:0006396 GO:0005730
- SO: SO:0000593
- PDB structures: PDBe

In molecular biology, SNORD64 (also known as HBII-13) is a non-coding RNA (ncRNA) molecule which functions in the biogenesis (modification) of other small nuclear RNAs (snRNAs). This type of modifying RNA is located in the nucleolus of the eukaryotic cell which is a major site of snRNA biogenesis. It is known as a small nucleolar RNA (snoRNA) and also often referred to as a guide RNA.

SNORD64 belongs to the C/D box class of snoRNAs which contain the conserved sequence motifs known as the C box (UGAUGA) and the D box (CUGA). Most of the members of the box C/D family function in directing site-specific 2'-O-methylation of substrate RNAs.

snoRNA HBII-13 is expressed mainly in the tissues of brain, but is also in the lungs, the kidneys and muscle; however HBII-13 has no identified target RNA. The HBII-13 gene is located in a 460 kb intron of the large paternally-expressed transcription unit (SNURF-SNRNP-UBE3A AS) along with several other snoRNAs HBII-436, HBII-437, HBII-438A/B and the clusters of HBII-85, HBII-52. This host gene is an antisense transcript to maternally expressed UBE3A gene.
