= German submarine U-69 =

U-69 may refer to one of the following German submarines:

- SM U-69, a Type U 66 submarine launched in 1915 and that served in the First World War until sunk after 11 July 1917
  - During the First World War, Germany also had these submarines with similar names:
    - SM UB-69, a Type UB III submarine launched in 1917 and sunk on 9 January 1918
    - SM UC-69, a Type UC II submarine launched in 1916 and sunk on 6 December 1917
- German submarine U-69 (1940), a Type VIIC submarine that served in the Second World War until sunk on 17 February 1943
