= MEG8 =

Non-coding RNA in humans

Identifiers
- Aliases: MEG8, maternally expressed 8 (non-protein coding), Bsr, Irm, LINC00024, NCRNA00024, Rian, maternally expressed 8, small nucleolar RNA host gene, SNHG23, SNHG24, lnc-MGC
- External IDs: OMIM: 613648; GeneCards: MEG8
Orthologs
Databases	NCBI: entry; OMA: entry
Species	Human	Mouse
Entrez	79104	n/a
Ensembl	ENSG00000225746	n/a
UniProt	n a	n/a
RefSeq (mRNA)	n/a	n/a
RefSeq (protein)	n/a	n/a
Location (UCSC)	n/a	n/a
PubMed search		n/a
- Wikidata
View/Edit Human

In molecular biology, Maternally expressed 8 (non-protein coding), also known as MEG8 or Rian (RNA Imprinted and Accumulated in Nucleus), is a long non-coding RNA. It is an imprinted gene, which is maternally expressed. It is expressed in the nucleus and (in an eight-week-old sheep) is preferentially expressed in skeletal muscle.

== See also ==
- Long noncoding RNA
