= DLK1 =

Protein-coding gene in the species Homo sapiens

Identifiers
- Aliases: DLK1, DLK, DLK-1, Delta1, FA1, PREF1, Pref-1, ZOG, pG2, AW742678, DlkI, Ly107, Peg9, SCP1, delta like non-canonical Notch ligand 1
- External IDs: OMIM: 176290; MGI: 94900; GeneCards: DLK1

Gene location (Human)
Chr.	Chromosome 14 (human)
Band	14q32.2	Start	100,725,705 bp
Band	14q32.2	End	100,738,224 bp

Gene location (Mouse)
Chr.	Chromosome 12 (mouse)
Band	12 F1|12 60.17 cM	Start	109,418,749 bp
Band	12 F1|12 60.17 cM	End	109,429,262 bp
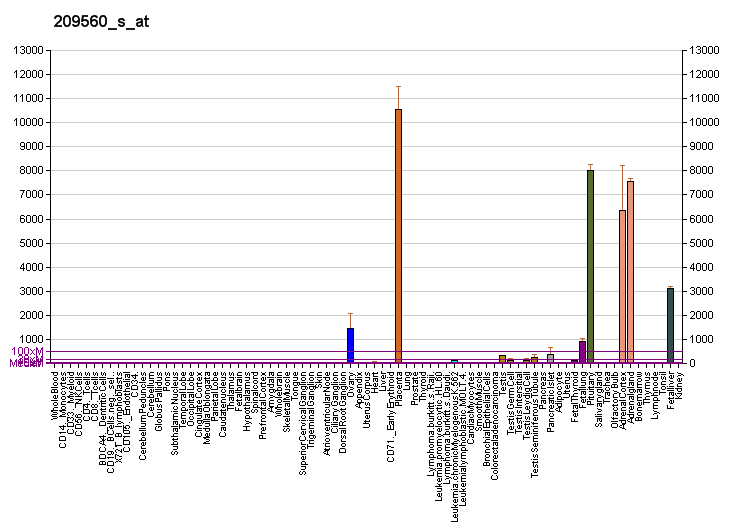
RNA expression pattern
Bgee	Human / Mouse (ortholog); Top expressed in: right adrenal cortex; left adrenal cortex; anterior pituitary; cartilage tissue; beta cell; glutes; left ovary; placenta; parotid gland; body of tongue / Top expressed in: yolk sac; adrenal gland; hypothalamus; placenta; neural tube; mesencephalon; genital tubercle; limb; rhombencephalon; tail of embryo; More reference expression data
BioGPS	More reference expression data
Gene ontology
Molecular function	calcium ion binding; molecular function
Cellular component	integral component of membrane; membrane; extracellular space; cytoplasm
Biological process	cell differentiation; negative regulation of Notch signaling pathway
Sources:Amigo / QuickGO
Orthologs
Databases	NCBI: entry; OMA: entry
Species	Human	Mouse
Entrez	8788	13386
Ensembl	ENSG00000185559	ENSMUSG00000040856
UniProt	P80370	Q09163
RefSeq (mRNA)	NM_001032997; NM_003836; NM_001317172	NM_001190703; NM_001190704; NM_001190705; NM_010052
RefSeq (protein)	NP_001304101; NP_003827; NP_003827.3	NP_001177632; NP_001177633; NP_001177634; NP_034182
Location (UCSC)	Chr 14: 100.73 – 100.74 Mb	Chr 12: 109.42 – 109.43 Mb
PubMed search
- Wikidata
View/Edit Human	View/Edit Mouse

Protein delta homolog 1, delta like non-canonical Notch ligand 1, fetal antigen 1 or preadipocyte factor 1 is a protein that in humans is encoded by the DLK1 gene.

It is expressed as a transmembrane protein, but a soluble form cleaved off by ADAM17 is active in inhibiting adipogenesis, the differentiation of pre-adipocytes into adipocytes.

It is a member of the EGF-like family of homeotic proteins.

Part of the Dlk1-DIO3 imprinting control region, this gene is one involved in the epigenetic process that causes a subset of genes to be regulated based on their parental origin.

Such imprinted genes are required for the formation of the placenta as well as the development of cellular lineages such as those derived from the mesoderm and ectoderm.
