= RTL1 =

Protein-coding gene in humans

Identifiers
- Aliases: RTL1, MART1, Mar1, PEG11, retrotransposon-like 1, retrotransposon Gag like 1, SIRH2, HUR1
- External IDs: OMIM: 611896; MGI: 2656842; GeneCards: RTL1

Gene location (Human)
Chr.	Chromosome 14 (human)
Band	14q32.2-q32.31	Start	100,879,753 bp
Band	14q32.2-q32.31	End	100,903,722 bp

Gene location (Mouse)
Chr.	Chromosome 12 (mouse)
Band	12|12 F1	Start	109,555,627 bp
Band	12|12 F1	End	109,566,764 bp
RNA expression pattern
Bgee	Human / Mouse (ortholog); Top expressed in: testicle; placenta; hypothalamus; sural nerve; gonad; substantia nigra; left adrenal cortex; left ovary; right adrenal gland; right ovary / Top expressed in: crus of diaphragm; yolk sac; placenta; striatum of neuraxis; hypothalamus; intercostal muscle; adrenal gland; tongue; superior frontal gyrus; internal granular layer; More reference expression data
BioGPS	n/a
Orthologs
Databases	NCBI: entry; OMA: entry
Species	Human	Mouse
Entrez	388015	353326
Ensembl	ENSG00000254656	ENSMUSG00000085925
UniProt	A6NKG5	Q7M732
RefSeq (mRNA)	NM_001134888	NM_184109
RefSeq (protein)	NP_001128360	NP_908998
Location (UCSC)	Chr 14: 100.88 – 100.9 Mb	Chr 12: 109.56 – 109.57 Mb
PubMed search
- Wikidata
View/Edit Human	View/Edit Mouse

RTL1 (retrotransposon like 1) is a retrotransposon derived protein coding gene. It is also known as PEG11 and is a paternally expressed imprinted gene, part of genomic imprinting. RTL1 plays an important role in the maintenance of fetal capillaries and is expressed in high quantities during late stage of fetal development. The expression of this gene is important for the development of the placenta, the fetus-maternal interface. Because the placenta is the first organ to form during the development of an embryo, problems in its establishment and biological role lead to complications during gestation. This organ maintains the fetus throughout the pregnancy and is therefore sensitive to disruptions. Studies in mice suggest that disruption of the RTL1 concentration, whether increasing or decreasing the amount of this protein coding gene, can lead to serious errors in the conservation of placental fetal capillaries. RTL1 knockout mice have shown obstruction in fetal development along with late fetal/neonatal death. Studies from sheep homologs suggest that high expression levels of RTL1 can lead to skeletal muscle hypertrophy This is due to over-expression patterns in the paternal allele specific gene.
