= N6-Methyladenosine =

Modification in mRNA, DNA

N^{6}-Methyladenosine

Names
- IUPAC name N^{6}-Methyladenosine
- Systematic IUPAC name (2R,3S,4R,5R)-2-(Hydroxymethyl)-5-[6-(methylamino)-9H-purin-9-yl]oxolane-2,3-diol
- Other names m^{6}A, 6mA

Identifiers
CAS Number	1867-73-8
3D model (JSmol)	Interactive image
ChEBI	CHEBI:21891
ChemSpider	92307
PubChem CID	102175
UNII	CLE6G00625
CompTox Dashboard (EPA)	DTXSID6020858
- InChI: InChI=1S/C11H15N5O4/c1-12-9-6-10(14-3-13-9)16(4-15-6)11-8(19)7(18)5(2-17)20-11/h3-5,7-8,11,17-19H,2H2,1H3,(H,12,13,14)/t5-,7-,8-,11-/m1/s1 Key: VQAYFKKCNSOZKM-IOSLPCCCSA-N
- SMILES: n2c1c(ncnc1NC)n(c2)[C@@H]3O[C@@H]([C@@H](O)[C@H]3O)CO

Properties
Chemical formula	C_{11}H_{15}N_{5}O_{4}
Molar mass	281.272 g·mol^{−1}
- Except where otherwise noted, data are given for materials in their standard state (at 25 °C [77 °F], 100 kPa). Infobox references

N^{6}-Methyladenosine (m^{6}A) was originally identified and partially characterised in the 1970s, and is an abundant modification in mRNA and DNA. It is found within some viruses, and most eukaryotes including mammals, insects, plants and yeast. It is also found in tRNA, rRNA, and small nuclear RNA (snRNA) as well as several long non-coding RNA, such as Xist.

The methylation of adenosine (on RNA) is directed by a large m^{6}A methyltransferase complex containing METTL3, which is the subunit that binds S-adenosyl-L-methionine (SAM). In vitro, this methyltransferase complex preferentially methylates RNA oligonucleotides containing GGACU and a similar preference was identified in vivo in mapped m^{6}A sites in Rous sarcoma virus genomic RNA and in bovine prolactin mRNA. More recent studies have characterized other key components of the m^{6}A methyltransferase complex in mammals, including METTL14, Wilms tumor 1 associated protein (WTAP), VIRMA and METTL5. Following a 2010 speculation of m^{6}A in mRNA being dynamic and reversible, the discovery of the first m^{6}A demethylase, fat mass and obesity-associated protein (FTO) in 2011 confirmed this hypothesis and revitalized interests in the study of m^{6}A. A second m^{6}A demethylase alkB homolog 5 (ALKBH5) was later discovered as well.

The biological functions of m^{6}A are mediated through a group of RNA binding proteins that specifically recognize the methylated adenosine on RNA. These binding proteins are named m^{6}A readers. The YT521-B homology (YTH) domain family of proteins (YTHDF1, YTHDF2, YTHDF3 and YTHDC1) have been characterized as direct m^{6}A readers and have a conserved m^{6}A-binding pocket. Insulin-like growth factor-2 mRNA-binding proteins 1, 2, and 3 (IGF2BP1–3) are reported as a novel class of m^{6}A readers. IGF2BPs use K homology (KH) domains to selectively recognize m6A-containing RNAs and promote their translation and stability. These m^{6}A readers, together with m^{6}A methyltransferases (writers) and demethylases (erasers), establish a complex mechanism of m^{6}A regulation in which writers and erasers determine the distributions of m^{6}A on RNA, whereas readers mediate m^{6}A-dependent functions. m^{6}A has also been shown to mediate a structural switch termed m^{6}A switch.

The specificity of m^{6}A installation on mRNA is controlled by exon architecture and exon junction complexes. Exon junction complexes suppress m^{6}A methylation near exon-exon junctions by packaging nearby RNA and protecting it from methylation by the m^{6}A methyltransferase complex. m^{6}A regions in long internal and terminal exons, away from exon-exon junctions and exon junction complexes, escape suppression and can be methylated by the methyltransferase complex.

In eukaryotes, m^{6}dA (DNA) is enriched in transcriptionally permissive regions, colocalizing with H3K4me3 nucleosomes. Production of m^{6}dA is mediated by AMT1 (MTA1) and AMT6/7 (MTA9), which are distantly related to the RNA-methylating enzymes. The two form a complex and are inferred to exist in the common ancestor of extant eukaryotes, but have been lost in many lineages including animals and plants.

== In eukaryotes ==
=== Yeast ===
In budding yeast (Saccharomyces cerevisiae), the expression of the homologue of METTL3, IME4, is induced in diploid cells in response to nitrogen and fermentable carbon source starvation and is required for mRNA methylation and the initiation of correct meiosis and sporulation. mRNAs of IME1 and IME2, key early regulators of meiosis, are known to be targets for methylation, as are transcripts of IME4 itself.

=== Plants ===
In plants, the majority of the m^{6}A is found within 150 nucleotides before the start of the poly(A) tail.

Mutations in MTA, the Arabidopsis thaliana homologue of METTL3, results in embryo arrest at the globular stage. A >90% reduction of m^{6}A levels in mature plants leads to dramatically altered growth patterns and floral homeotic abnormalities.

=== Mammals ===
Mapping of m^{6}A in human and mouse RNA has identified over 18,000 m^{6}A sites in the transcripts of more than 7,000 human genes with a consensus sequence of [G/A/U][G>A]m^{6}AC[U>A/C] consistent with the previously identified motif. The localization of individual m^{6}A sites in many mRNAs is highly similar between human and mouse, and transcriptome-wide analysis reveals that m^{6}A is found in regions of high evolutionary conservation. m^{6}A is found within long internal exons and is preferentially enriched within 3' UTRs and around stop codons. m^{6}A within 3' UTRs is also associated with the presence of microRNA binding sites; roughly 2/3 of the mRNAs which contain an m^{6}A site within their 3' UTR also have at least one microRNA binding site. By integrating all m^{6}A sequencing data, a novel database called RMBase has identified and provided ~200,000 sites in the human and mouse genomes corresponding to N6-Methyladenosines (m^{6}A) in RNA.

Precise m6A mapping by m6A-CLIP/IP (briefly m6A-CLIP) revealed that a majority of m6A locates in the last exon of mRNAs in multiple tissues/cultured cells of mouse and human, and the m6A enrichment around stop codons is a coincidence that many stop codons locate round the start of last exons where m6A is truly enriched. The major presence of m6A in last exon (>=70%) allows the potential for 3'UTR regulation, including alternative polyadenylation. The study combining m6A-CLIP with rigorous cell fractionation biochemistry reveals that m6A mRNA modifications are deposited in nascent pre-mRNA and are not required for splicing but do specify cytoplasmic turnover.

m^{6}A is susceptible to dynamic regulation both throughout development and in response to cellular stimuli. Analysis of m^{6}A in mouse brain RNA reveals that m^{6}A levels are low during embryonic development and increase dramatically by adulthood. In mESCs and during mouse development, FTO has been shown to mediate LINE1 RNA m^{6}A demethylation and consequently affect local chromatin state and nearby gene transcription. Additionally, silencing the m^{6}A methyltransferase significantly affects gene expression and alternative RNA splicing patterns, resulting in modulation of the p53 (also known as TP53) signalling pathway and apoptosis.

m^{6}A is also found on the RNA components of R-loops in human and plant cells, where it is involved in regulation of stability of RNA:DNA hybrids. It has been reported to modulate R-loop levels with different outcomes (R-loop resolution and stabilization).

The importance of m^{6}A methylation for physiological processes was recently demonstrated. Inhibition of m^{6}A methylation via pharmacological inhibition of cellular methylations or more specifically by siRNA-mediated silencing of the m^{6}A methylase Mettl3 led to the elongation of the circadian period. In contrast, overexpression of Mettl3 led to a shorter period. The mammalian circadian clock, composed of a transcription feedback loop tightly regulated to oscillate with a period of about 24 hours, is therefore extremely sensitive to perturbations in m^{6}A-dependent RNA processing, likely due to the presence of m^{6}A sites within clock gene transcripts. The effects of global methylation inhibition on the circadian period in mouse cells can be prevented by ectopic expression of an enzyme from the bacterial methyl metabolism. Mouse cells expressing this bacterial protein were resistant to pharmacological inhibition of methyl metabolism, showing no decrease in mRNA m^{6}A methylation or protein methylation.

==== In development ====
m^{6}A modifications, along with other epigenetic changes, have been shown to play important roles during eukaryotic development. Hematopoietic Stem Cells (HSCs), Neuronal Stem Cells (NSCs) and Primordial Germ Cells (PCGs) have all been shown to undergo m^{6}A modifications during growth and differentiation. Depending on the stage of development, modifications to HSCs can either promote or inhibit stem cell differentiation by affecting the epithelial-to-hemopoietic transition via METTL3 inhibition or depletion. m^{6}A modifications to NSCs can causes changes in brain size, neuron formation, long-term memory, and learning ability. These changes are often caused by inhibition of either METTL or YTHDF readers and writers. In the reproductive system, m^{6}A modifications have been shown to disrupt the maternal-to-zygotic mRNA transition and negatively affect both gamete formation and fertility. Similar to NSCs, inhibition of the METTL and YTHDF families of proteins is often a catalyst for these changes. m⁶A is also required for proper axonal development by regulating the transport and local translation of actin mRNAs in neurons, and its disruption leads to impaired axon growth.

== Clinical significance ==
Considering the versatile functions of m^{6}A in various physiological processes, it is thus not surprising to find links between m^{6}A and numerous human diseases; many originated from mutations or single nucleotide polymorphisms (SNPs) of cognate factors of m^{6}A. The linkages between m^{6}A and numerous cancer types have been indicated in reports that include stomach cancer, prostate cancer, breast cancer, pancreatic cancer, kidney cancer, mesothelioma, sarcoma, and leukaemia. The impacts of m^{6}A on cancer cell proliferation might be much more profound with more data emerging. The depletion of METTL3 is known to cause apoptosis of cancer cells and reduce invasiveness of cancer cells, while the activation of ALKBH5 by hypoxia was shown to cause cancer stem cell enrichment. m^{6}A has also been indicated in the regulation of energy homeostasis and obesity, as FTO is a key regulatory gene for energy metabolism and obesity. SNPs of FTO have been shown to associate with body mass index in human populations and occurrence of obesity and diabetes. The influence of FTO on pre-adipocyte differentiation has been suggested. The connection between m^{6}A and neuronal disorders has also been studied. For instance, neurodegenerative diseases may be affected by m^{6}A as the cognate dopamine signalling was shown to be dependent on FTO and correct m^{6}A methylation on key signalling transcripts. The mutations in HNRNPA2B1, a potential reader of m^{6}A, have been known to cause neurodegeneration. The IGF2BP1–3, a novel class of m^{6}A reader, has oncogenic functions. IGF2BP1–3 knockdown or knockout decreased MYC protein expression, cell proliferation and colony formation in human cancer cell lines. The ZC3H13, a member of the m6A methyltransferase complex, markedly inhibited colorectal cancer cells growth when knocked down.

Additionally, m^{6}A has been reported to impact viral infections. Many RNA viruses including SV40, adenovirus, herpes virus, Rous sarcoma virus, and influenza virus have been known to contain internal m^{6}A methylation on virus genomic RNA. Several more recent studies have revealed that m^{6}A regulators govern the efficiency of infection, replication, translation and transport of RNA viruses such as human immunodeficiency virus (HIV), hepatitis B virus (HBV), hepatitis C virus (HCV), and Zika virus (ZIKV). These results suggest m^{6}A and its cognate factors play crucial roles in regulating virus life cycles and host-viral interactions.

Aside from affecting viruses themselves, m^{6}A modifications can also disrupt the innate immune response. For example, in HBV, m^{6}A modifications were shown to disrupt the recognition of viruses by RIG-1, a pattern recognition receptor in the immune system. Modifications can also disrupt downstream signaling pathways via mechanisms including ubiquitination and changes in the levels of protein expression.

== In bacteria ==
M6A methylation is also widespread in bacteria, influencing functions such as DNA replication, repair, and gene expression, and prokaryotic defense.

In replication, M6A modifications mark DNA regions where the initiation stage takes place as well as regulates precise timing via the Dam methyltransferase in E. coli. Another enzyme, Dam DNA methylase regulates mismatch repair using M6A modifications which influence other repair proteins by recognizing specific mismatches.

In some cases of DNA protection, M6A methylations (along with M4C modifications) play a role in the protection of bacterial DNA by influencing certain endonucleases via the restriction-modification system, decreasing the influence of bacteriophages. One such role is introducing a methyltransferase which recognizes the same target site that restriction enzymes (Type 1 restriction enzymes) attack and modifying it in order to stop such enzymes from attacking bacteria DNA.
