= RNA therapeutics =

Medications based on ribonucleic acids

RNA therapeutics are a new class of medications based on ribonucleic acid (RNA). Research has been working on clinical use since the 1990s, with significant success in cancer therapy in the early 2010s. In 2020 and 2021, mRNA vaccines have been developed globally for use in combating the coronavirus disease (COVID-19 pandemic). The Pfizer–BioNTech COVID-19 vaccine was the first mRNA vaccine approved by a medicines regulator, followed by the Moderna COVID-19 vaccine, and others.

The main types of RNA therapeutics are those based on messenger RNA (mRNA), antisense RNA (asRNA), RNA interference (RNAi), RNA activation (RNAa) and RNA aptamers. Of the four types, mRNA-based therapy is the only type which is based on triggering synthesis of proteins within cells, making it particularly useful in vaccine development. Antisense RNA is complementary to coding mRNA and is used to trigger mRNA inactivation to prevent the mRNA from being used in protein translation. RNAi-based systems use a similar mechanism, and involve the use of both small interfering RNA (siRNA) and micro RNA (miRNA) to prevent mRNA translation and/or degrade mRNA. Small activating RNA (saRNA) represents a novel class of RNA therapeutics that upregulates gene expression via the RNAa mechanism, offering a unique mechanism compared to other RNA-based therapies. However, RNA aptamers are short, single stranded RNA molecules produced by directed evolution to bind to a variety of biomolecular targets with high affinity thereby affecting their normal in vivo activity.

RNA is synthesized from template DNA by RNA polymerase with messenger RNA (mRNA) serving as the intermediary biomolecule between DNA expression and protein translation. Because of its unique properties (such as its typically single-stranded nature and its 2' OH group) and its ability to adopt many different secondary/tertiary structures, both coding and noncoding RNAs have attracted attention in medicine. Research has begun to explore RNAs potential to be used for therapeutic benefit, and unique challenges have occurred during drug discovery and implementation of RNA therapeutics.

== mRNA ==
Messenger RNA (mRNA) is a single-stranded RNA molecule that is complementary to one of the DNA strands of a gene. An mRNA molecule transfers a portion of the DNA code to other parts of the cell for making proteins. DNA therapeutics needs access to the nucleus to be transcribed into RNA, and its functionality depends on nuclear envelope breakdown during cell division. However, mRNA therapeutics do not need to enter into the nucleus to be functional since it will be translated immediately once it has reached to the cytoplasm. Moreover, unlike plasmids and viral vectors, mRNAs do not integrate into the genome and therefore do not have the risk of insertional mutagenesis, making them suitable for use in cancer vaccines, tumor immunotherapy and infectious disease prevention.

=== Discovery and development ===
In 1953, Alfred Day Hershey reported that soon after infection with phage, bacteria produced a form of RNA at a high level and this RNA was also broken down rapidly. However, the first clear indication of mRNA was from the work of Elliot Volkin and Lazarus Astrachan in 1956 by infecting E.coli with T2 bacteriophages and putting them into the medium with ^{32}P. They found out that the protein synthesis of E.coli was stopped and phage proteins were synthesized. Then, in May 1961, their collaborated researchers Sydney Brenner, François Jacob, and Jim Watson announced the isolation of mRNA. For a few decades after mRNA discovery, people focused on understanding the structural, functional, and metabolism pathway aspects of mRNAs. However, in 1990, Jon A. Wolff demonstrated the idea of nucleic acid-encoded drugs by direct injecting in vitro transcribed (IVT) mRNA or plasmid DNA (pDNA) into the skeletal muscle of mice which expressed the encoded protein in the injected muscle.

Once IVT mRNA has reached the cytoplasm, the mRNA is translated instantly. Thus, it does not need to enter the nucleus to be functional. Also, it does not integrate into the genome and therefore does not have the risk of insertional mutagenesis. Moreover, IVT mRNA is only transiently active and is completely degraded via physiological metabolic pathways. Due to these reasons, IVT mRNA has undergone extensive preclinical investigation.

=== Mechanisms ===
In vitro transcription (IVT) is performed on a linearized DNA plasmid template containing the targeted coding sequence. Then, naked mRNA or mRNA complexed in a nanoparticle will be delivered systemically or locally. Subsequently, a part of the exogenous naked mRNA or complexed mRNA will go through cell-specific mechanisms. Once in the cytoplasm, the IVT mRNA is translated by the protein synthesis machinery.

There are two identified RNA sensors, toll-like receptors (TLRs) and the RIG-I-like receptor family. TLRs are localized in the endosomal compartment of cells, such as DCs and macrophages. RIG-I-like family is as a pattern recognition receptor (PRR). However, the immune response mechanisms and process of mRNA vaccine recognition by cellular sensors and the mechanism of sensor activation are still unclear.

=== Applications ===
==== Cancer immunotherapy ====
In 1995, Robert Conry demonstrated that intramuscular injection of naked RNA encoding carcinoembryonic antigen elicited antigen-specific antibody responses. Then, it was elaborated by demonstrating that dendritic cells(DCs) exposed to mRNA coding for specific antigens or to total mRNA extracted from tumor cells and injected into tumor-bearing mice induced T cell immune responses and inhibited the growth of tumors. Then, researchers started to approach mRNA transfected DCs using vaccines based on ex vivo IVT mRNA-transfected DCs. Meanwhile, Argos Therapeutics had initiated a Phase III clinical trial using DCs with advanced renal cell carcinoma in 2015 (NCT01582672) but it was terminated due to the lack of efficacy.

For further application, IVT mRNA was optimized for in situ transfections of DCs in vivo. It improved the translation efficiency and stability of IVT mRNA and enhanced the presentation of the mRNA-encoded antigen on MHC class I and II molecules. Then, they found out that the direct injection of naked IVT mRNA into lymph nodes was the most effective way to induce T cell responses. Based on this discovery, first-in-human testing of the injection of naked IVT mRNA encoding cancer antigens by BioNTech has started with patients with melanoma (NCT01684241).

Recently, the new cancer immunotherapy, the combining of self-delivering RNA(sd-rxRNA) and adoptive cell transfer(ACT) therapy, was invented by RXi Pharmaceuticals and the Karolinska Institute. In this therapy, the sd-rxRNA eliminated the expression of immunosuppressive receptors and proteins in therapeutic immune cells so it improved the ability of immune cells to destroy the tumor cells. Then, the PD-1 targeted sd-rxRNA helped increasing the anti-tumor activity of tumor-infiltrating lymphocytes (TIL) against melanoma cells. Based on this idea, the mRNA-4157 has been tested and passed phase I clinical trial.

Cytosolic nucleic acid-sensing pathways can enhance immune response to cancer. RIG-I agonist, stem loop RNA (SLR) 14. Tumor growth was significantly delayed and extended survival in mice. SLR14 improved antitumor efficacy of anti-PD1 antibody over single-agent treatment. SLR14 was absorbed by CD11b+ myeloid cells in the tumor microenvironment. Genes associated with immune defense were significantly up-regulated, along with increased CD8+ T lymphocytes, NK cells, and CD11b+ cells. SLR14 inhibited nonimmunogenic B16 tumor growth, leaving immune memory.

==== Vaccines ====
In 1993, the first success of an mRNA vaccine was reported in mice, by using liposome-encapsulated IVT mRNA which is encoding the nucleoprotein of influenza that induced virus-specific T cells. Then, IVT mRNA was formulated with synthetic lipid nanoparticles and it induced protective antibody responses against the respiratory syncytial virus(RSV) and influenza virus in mice.

There are a few different types of IVT mRNA-based vaccine development for infectious diseases. One of the successful types is using self-amplifying IVT mRNA that has sequences of positive-stranded RNA viruses. It was originally developed for a flavivirus and it was workable with intradermal injection. One of the other ways is injecting a two-component vaccine which is containing an mRNA adjuvant and naked IVT mRNA encoding influenza hemagglutinin antigen only or in combination with neuraminidase encoding IVT mRNA.

For example, for the HIV treatment, vaccines are using DCs transfected with IVT mRNA that is encoding HIV proteins. There are a few phase I and II clinical trials using IVT mRNA encoding combinations and it shows that antigen-specific CD8+ and CD4+ T cell responses can be induced. However, no antiviral effects have been observed in the clinical trial.

One of the other mRNA vaccines is for COVID-19. The Severe Acute Respiratory Syndrome CoronaVirus 2 (SARS-CoV-2) outbreaks in December 2019 and spread all over the world, causing a pandemic of respiratory illness designated coronavirus disease 2019 (COVID-19). The Moderna COVID-19 vaccine, manufactured by Moderna since 2020, is a lipid nanoparticle (LNP) encapsulated mRNA-based vaccine that encodes for a full-length, prefusion stabilized spike(S)-2P antigen of SARS-CoV-2 with a transmembrane anchor.

==== Anti-viral ====
In 2021, SLR14 was reported to prevent infection in the lower respiratory tract and severe disease in an interferon type I (IFN-I)–dependent manner in mice. Immunodeficient mice with chronic SARS-CoV-2 infection experienced near-sterilizing innate immunity with no help from the adaptive immune system.

==== Tissue regeneration ====
A 2022 study by researchers from the Mayo Clinic, Maastricht University, and Ethris GmBH, a biotech company that focuses on RNA therapeutics, found that chemically modified mRNA encoding BMP-2 promoted dosage-dependent healing of femoral osteotomies in male rats. The mRNA molecules were complexed within nonviral lipid particles, loaded onto sponges, and surgically implanted into the bone defects. They remained localized around the site of application. Compared to receiving rhBMP-2 directly, bony tissues regenerated after mRNA treatment displayed superior strength and less formation of massive callus.

=== Limitations ===
There are many challenges for the successful translation of mRNA into drugs because mRNA is a very large and heavy molecule(10^5 ~ 10^6 Da). Moreover, mRNA is unstable and easily degraded by nucleases, and it also activates the immune systems. Furthermore, mRNA has a high negative charge density and it reduces the permeation of mRNA across cellular membranes. Due to these reasons, without the appropriate delivery system, mRNA is degraded easily and the half-life of mRNA without a delivery system is only around 7 hours. Even though some degrees of challenges could be overcome by chemical modifications, delivery of mRNA remains an obstacle. The methods that have been researched to improve the delivery system of mRNA are using microinjection, RNA patches (mRNA loaded in a dissolving micro-needle), gene gun, protamine condensation, RNA adjuvants, and encapsulating mRNA in nanoparticles with lipids.

Even though In Vitro Translated (IVT) mRNA with delivery agents showed improved resistance against degradation, it needs more studies on how to improve the efficiency of the delivery of naked mRNA in vivo.

=== Approved RNA Therapeutics ===
- patisiran
- givosiran
- lumasiran
- inclisiran

== Antisense RNA ==
Antisense RNA is the non-coding and single-stranded RNA that is complementary to a coding sequence of mRNA. It inhibits the ability of mRNA to be translated into proteins. Short antisense RNA transcripts are produced within the nucleus by the action of the enzyme Dicer, which cleaves double-stranded RNA precursors into 21–26 nucleotide long RNA species.

There is an antisense-based discovery strategy, rationale and design of screening assays, and the application of such assays for screening of natural product extracts and the discovery of fatty acid condensing enzyme inhibitors. Antisense RNA is used for treating cancer and inhibition of metastasis and vectors for antisense sequestration. Particularly MicroRNAs(miRs) 15 and 16 to a patient in need of the treatment for diagnosis and prophylaxis of cancer. Antisense drugs are based on the fact that antisense RNA hybridizes with and inactivates mRNA. These drugs are short sequences of RNA that attach to mRNA and stop a particular gene from producing the protein for which it encodes. Antisense drugs are being developed to treat lung cancer, diabetes and diseases such as arthritis and asthma with a major inflammatory component. It shows that the decreased expression of MLLT4 antisense RNA 1 (MLLT4‑AS1) is a potential biomarker and a predictor of a poor prognosis for gastric cancer. So far, applications of antisense RNAs in antivirus and anticancer treatments and in regulating the expression of related genes in plants and microorganisms have been explored.

RNA-targeted therapies are being explored for severe genetic epilepsies; for example, ASO-mediated knockdown of KCNT1 has been investigated as an experimental approach for KCNT1-associated epileptic encephalopathy in humans, as well as in prenatal models.

Non-viral vectors, virus vectors and liposomes have been used to deliver the antisense RNA through the cell membrane into the cytoplasm and nucleus. It has been found that the viral vector based delivery is the most advantageous among different delivery systems because it has a high transfection efficacy. However, it is difficult to deliver antisense RNA only to the targeted sites. Also, due to the size and the stability issues of antisense RNA, there are some limitations to its use. To improve the delivery issues, chemical modifications, and new oligonucleotide designs have been studied to enhance the drug distribution, side effects, and tolerability.

== RNAi ==
Interfering RNA are a class of short, noncoding RNA that act to translationally or post-translationally repress gene expression. Their discovery and subsequent identification as key effectors of post-transcriptional gene regulation have made small interfering RNA (siRNA) and micro RNA (miRNA) potential therapeutics for systemic diseases. The RNAi system was originally discovered in 1990 by Jorgensen et al., who were doing research involving the introduction of coloration genes into petunias, and it is thought that this system originally developed as a means of innate immunity against double-stranded RNA viruses.

=== siRNA ===
A schematic of the mechanism for siRNA and miRNA gene regulation in vivo.

Small interfering (siRNA) are short, 19-23 base-pair (with a 3' overhang of two nucleotides), double-stranded pieces of RNA that participate in the RNA-induced silencing complex (RISC) for gene silencing. Specifically, siRNA is bound by the RISC complex where it is unwound using ATP hydrolysis. It is then used as a guide by the enzyme "Slicer" to target mRNAs for degradation based on complementary base-pairing to the target mRNA. As a therapeutic, siRNA is able to be delivered locally, through the eye or nose, to treat various diseases. Local delivery benefits from simple formulation and drug delivery and high bioavailability of the drug. Systemic delivery is necessary to target cancers and other diseases. Targeting the siRNA when delivered locally is one of the main challenges in siRNA therapeutics. While it is possible to use intravenous injection to deliver siRNA therapies, concerns have been raised about the large volumes used in the injection, as these must often be ~20-30% of the total blood volume. Other methods of delivery include liposome packaging, conjugation to membrane-permeable peptides, and direct tissue/organ electroporation. Additionally, it has been found that exogeneous siRNAs only last a few days (a few weeks at most in non-dividing cells) in vivo. If siRNA is able to successfully reach its target, it has the potential to therapeutically regulate gene expression through its ability to base-pair to mRNA targets and promote their degradation through the RISC system Currently, siRNA-based therapy is in a phase I clinical trial for the treatment of age-related macular degeneration, although it is also being explored for use in cancer therapy. For instance, siRNA can be used to target mRNAs that code for proteins that promote tumor growth such as the VEGF receptor and telomerase enzyme.

=== miRNA ===
Micro RNAs (miRNAs) are short, ~19-23 base pair long RNA oligonucleotides that are involved in the microRNA-induced silencing complex. Specifically, once loaded onto the ARGONAUTE enzyme, miRNAs work with mRNAs to repress translation and post-translationally destabilize mRNA. While they are functionally similar to siRNAs, miRNAs do not require extensive base-pairing for mRNA silencing (can require as few as seven base-pairs with target), thus allowing them to broadly affect a wider range of mRNA targets. In the cell, miRNA uses switch, tuning, and neutral interactions to finely regulate gene repression. As a therapeutic, miRNA has the potential to affect biochemical pathways throughout the organism.

With more than 400 miRNA identified in humans, discerning their target gene for repression is the first challenge. Multiple databases have been built, for example TargetScan, using miRNA seed matching. In vitro assays assist in determining the phenotypic effects of miRNAs, but due to the complex nature of gene regulation not all identified miRNAs have the expected effect. Additionally, several miRNAs have been found to act as either tumor suppressors or oncogenes in vivo, such as the oncogenic miR-155 and miR-17-92.

In clinical trials, miRNA are commonly used as biomarkers for a variety of diseases, potentially providing earlier diagnosis as well as disease progression, stage, and genetic links. Phase 1 and 2 trials currently test miRNA mimics (to express genes) and miRNA (to repress genes) in patients with cancers and other diseases. In particular, mimic miRNAs are used to introduce miRNAs that act as tumor suppressors into cancerous tissues, while miRNA antagonists are used to target oncogenic miRNAs to prevent their cancer-promoting activity. Therapeutic miRNA is also used in addition to common therapies (such as cancer therapies) that are known to overexpress or destabilize the patient miRNA levels. An example of one mimic miRNA therapy that demonstrated efficacy in impeding lung cancer tumor growth in mouse studies is miR-34a.

One concerning aspect of miRNA-based therapies is the potential for the exogeneous miRNA to affect miRNA silencing mechanisms within normal body cells, thereby affecting normal cellular biochemical pathways. However, in vivo studies have indicated that miRNAs display little to no effect in non-target tissues/organs.

== Small activating RNAs (saRNAs) ==
Small activating RNAs (saRNAs) are short double-stranded RNA molecules (typically 19–21 nucleotides in length) that induce transcriptional activation of target genes through a process known as RNA activation (RNAa). Unlike RNA interference (RNAi), which silences gene expression, saRNAs upregulate gene expression by targeting promoter regions of DNA and recruiting transcriptional machinery.

The mechanism of RNAa involves the formation of an RNA-induced transcriptional activation (RITA) complex. This complex includes Argonaute proteins (particularly Ago2), RNA helicase A (RHA), and other transcriptional coactivators, which facilitate the activation of RNA polymerase II at the targeted promoter. This process is often associated with epigenetic changes, such as histone modifications, that promote active transcription.

saRNAs have demonstrated potential in preclinical studies for treating diseases caused by insufficient gene expression, such as cancer and metabolic disorders. For example, saRNAs have been used to reactivate tumor suppressor genes in cancer cells, offering a promising therapeutic approach. Additionally, saRNAs are being explored for their ability to upregulate genes involved in metabolic regulation, neurodegenerative diseases, and other conditions.

An example of an saRNA therapeutic in clinical development is MTL-CEBPA, which targets the CEBPA gene to treat liver cancer. This drug, developed by MiNA Therapeutics, has shown promise in early-phase clinical trials. Another saRNA therapeutic, RAG-01, developed by Ractigen Therapeutics, is being investigated for the treatment of non-muscle invasive bladder cancer (NMIBC) and has shown promising early complete responses (CRs) in Phase I trial for BCG-unresponsive patients.

saRNAs represent a significant advancement in RNA therapeutics, expanding the scope of RNA-based therapies to include gene activation in addition to gene silencing.

== RNA aptamers ==
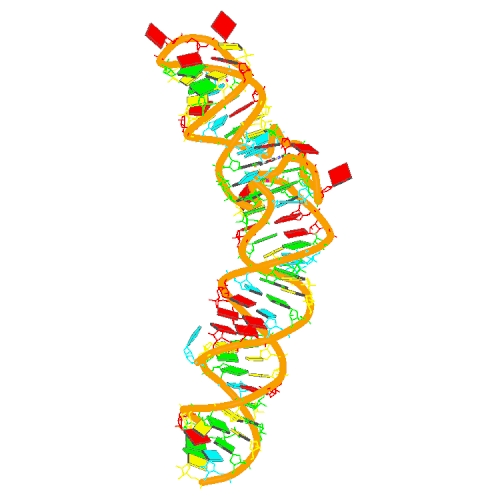
An RNA aptamer known as "Spinach" was created as a fluorescent imaging tool in vivo. Its fluorescent activity is based upon binding to 3,5-difluoro-4-hydroxybenzylidene imidazolidinone (DFHBI).

Broadly, aptamers are small molecules composed of either single-stranded DNA or RNA and are typically 20-100 nucleotides in length, or ~3-60 kDa. Because of their single-stranded nature, aptamers are capable of forming many secondary structures, including pseudoknots, stem loops, and bulges, through intra-strand base pairing interactions. The combinations of secondary structures present in an aptamer confer it a particular tertiary structure which in turn dictates the specific target the aptamer will selectively bind to. Because of the selective binding ability of aptamers, they are considered a promising biomolecule for use in pharmaceuticals. Additionally, aptamers exhibit tight binding to targets, with dissociation constants often in the pM to nM range. Besides their strong binding ability, aptamers are also valued because they can be used on targets that are not capable of being bound by small peptides generated by phage display or by antibodies, and they are able to differentiate between conformational isomers and amino acid substitutions. Also, because aptamers are nucleic-acid based, they can be directly synthesized, eliminating the need for cell-based expression and extraction as is the case in antibody production. RNA aptamers in particular are capable of producing a myriad of different structures, leading to speculations that they are more discriminating in their target affinity compared to DNA aptamers.

=== Discovery and development ===
Aptamers were originally discovered in 1990 when Lary Gold and Craig Tuerk utilized a method of directed evolution known as SELEX to isolate a small single stranded RNA molecule that was capable of binding to T4 bacteriophage DNA polymerase. Additionally, the term “aptamer” was coined by Andrew Ellington, who worked with Jack Szostak to select an RNA aptamer that was capable of tight binding to certain organic dye molecules. The term itself is a conglomeration of the Latin “aptus” or “to fit” and the Greek “meros” or “part."

RNA aptamers are not so much “created” as “selected.” To develop an RNA aptamer capable of selective binding to a molecular target, a method known as Systematic Evolution of Ligands by EXponential Enrichment (SELEX) is used to isolate a unique RNA aptamer from a pool of ~10^13 to 10^16 different aptamers, otherwise known as a library. The library of potential aptamer oligonucleotides is then incubated with a non-target species so as to remove aptamers that exhibit non-specific binding. After subsequent removal of the non-specific aptamers, the remaining library members are then exposed to the desired target, which can be a protein, peptide, cell type, or even an organ (in the case of live animal-based SELEX). From there, the RNA aptamers which were bound to the target are transcribed to cDNA which then is amplified through PCR, and the PCR products are then re-transcribed to RNA. These new RNA transcripts are then used to repeat the selection cycle many times, thus eventually producing a homogeneous pool of RNA aptamers capable of highly specific, high-affinity target binding.

=== Examples ===
RNA aptamers can be designed to act as antagonists, agonists, or so-called ”RNA decoy aptamers." In the case of antagonists, the RNA aptamer is used either to prevent binding of a certain protein to its cell membrane receptor or to prevent the protein from performing its activity by binding to the protein's target. Currently, the only RNA aptamer-based therapies that have advanced to clinical trials act as antagonists. When RNA aptamers are designed to act as agonists, they promote immune cell activation as a co-stimulatory molecule, thus aiding in the mobilization of the body's own defense system. For RNA decoy aptamers, the synthetic RNA aptamer resembles a native RNA molecule. As such, proteins(s) which bind to the native RNA target instead bind to the RNA aptamer, possibly interfering with the biomolecular pathway of a particular disease. In addition to their utility as direct therapeutic agents, RNA aptamers are also being considered for other therapeutic roles. For instance, by conjugating the RNA aptamer to a drug compound, the RNA aptamer can act as a targeted delivery system for that drug. Such RNA aptamers are known as ApDCs. Additionally, through conjugation to radioisotope or a fluorescent dye molecule, RNA aptamers may be useful in diagnostic imaging.

Because of the SELEX process utilized to select RNA aptamers, RNA aptamers can be generated for many potential targets. By directly introducing the RNA aptamers to the target during SELEX, a very selective, high-affinity, homogeneous pool of RNA aptamers can be produced. As such, RNA aptamers can be made to target small peptides and proteins, as well as cell fragments, whole cells, and even specific tissues. Examples of RNA aptamer molecular targets and potential targets include vascular endothelial growth factor, osteoblasts, and C-X-C Chemokine Ligand 12 (CXCL2).

The chemical structure of the RNA aptamer known as Pegaptanib, a treatment for age-related macular degeneration.

An example of an RNA aptamer therapy includes Pegaptanib (aka Macugen ®), the only FDA-approved RNA aptamer treatment. Originally approved in 2004 to treat age-related macular degeneration, Pegaptanib is a 28 nucleotide RNA aptamer that acts as a VEGF antagonist. However, it is not as effective as antibody-based treatments such as bevacizumab and ranibizumab. Another example of an RNA aptamer therapeutic is NOX-A12, a 45 nucleotide RNA aptamer that is in clinical trials for chronic lymphocytic leukemia, pancreatic cancer, as well as other cancers. NOX-A12 acts as antagonist for CXCL12/SDF-1, a chemokine involved in tumor growth.

=== Limitations ===
While the high-selectivity and tight-binding of RNA aptamers have generated interest in their use as pharmaceuticals, there are many problems which have prevented them from being successful in vivo. For one, without modifications RNA aptamers are degraded after being introduced into the body by nucleases in the span of a few minutes. Also, due to their small size, RNA aptamers can be removed from the bloodstream by the renal system. Because of their negative charge, RNA aptamers are additionally known to bind proteins in the bloodstream, leading to non-target tissue delivery and toxicity. Care must also be taken when isolating the RNA aptamers, as aptamers which contain repeated Cytosine-Phosphate-Guanine (CpG) sequences will cause immune system activation through the Toll-like receptor pathway.

In order to combat some of the in vivo limitations of RNA aptamers, various modifications can be added to the nucleotides to aid in efficacy of the aptamer. For instance, a polyethylene glycol (PEG) moiety can be attached to increase the size of the aptamer, thereby preventing its removal from the bloodstream by the renal glomerulus. However, PEG has been implicated in allergic reactions during in vivo testing. Furthermore, modifications can be added to prevent nuclease degradation, such as a 2’ fluoro or amino group as well as a 3’ inverted thymidine. Additionally, the aptamer can be synthesized so that the ribose sugar is in the L-form instead of the D-form, further preventing nuclease recognition. Such aptamers are known as Spiegelmers. In order to prevent Toll-like receptor pathway activation, the cytosine nucleobases within the aptamer can be methylated. Nevertheless, despite these potential solutions to reduced in vivo efficacy, it is possible that chemically modifying the aptamer may weaken its binding affinity towards its target.

== See also ==
- Riboswitch
- ncRNA therapy
- Aptamer
