= List of non-starchy vegetables =

Non-starchy vegetables are vegetables that contain a lower proportion of carbohydrates and calories compared to their starchy counterparts. Thus, for the same calories, one can eat a larger quantity of non-starchy vegetables compared to smaller servings of starchy vegetables.

This list may not be complete

- Alfalfa sprouts
- Arugula
- Artichoke
- Asparagus
- Bamboo shoots
- Beans (green, Italian, yellow or wax)
- Bean sprouts
- Beets
- Bok choy
- Broccoli
- Brussels sprouts
- Cabbage
- Carrots
- Cauliflower
- Celery
- Chayote
- Chicory
- Chinese cabbage
- Chinese spinach
- Cucumber
- Eggplant
- Fennel
- Garlic
- Green onions
- Greens (beet or collard greens, dandelion, kale, mustard, turnip)
- Hearts of palm
- Herbs (parsley, cilantro, basil, rosemary, thyme, etc.)
- Jicama
- Kohlrabi
- Leeks
- Lettuce (endive, escarole, romaine or iceberg)
- Mushrooms
- Okra
- Onions
- Parsley
- Peppers (green, red, yellow, orange, jalapeño)
- Purslane
- Radishes
- Rapini
- Rhubarb
- Rutabaga
- Sauerkraut
- Scallions
- Shallots
- Snow peas or pea pods
- Spinach
- Summer squash
- Swiss chard
- Tomatillos
- Turnips
- Water chestnuts
- Watercress
- Zucchini
