= Process molecular gene concept =

Alternative gene definition

The Process Molecular Gene Concept is an alternative definition of a gene that states that in order for synthesis of a polypeptide to occur you need non-DNA factors and regulatory regions to regulate gene expression on DNA and derived mRNA. This is important because a DNA sequence can code for multiple polypeptides, so it is these non-DNA factors that are present in order to help determine the polypeptide that is made.

== Description ==
The definition was first proposed by Eva M. Neumann-Held, suggesting that a redefinition of our view of the "gene" in relation to developmental genetics. This concept claims that the definition is too general. We therefore need to either clarify its definition or stop using the term "gene". In the Cycles of Contingency, Neumann-Held states, "This empirical evidence shows that it is not only the presence of DNA sequence that determines the course of events that lead to the synthesis of a polypeptide but, in addition, specific non-DNA factors must act on DNA and derived mRNA to determine the particular processing mechanisms." The developmental state and tissue determine the outcome of the DNA.

An example Neumann-Held gives of this is RNA editing. Depending on the environmental and developmental state of the organism mRNA might enhance, delete, or even add nucleotides to create a different mRNA. So according to Neumann-Held the “gene” is the process that brings together the non-DNA elements to DNA in order to create a specific polypeptide. This process has specific interactions between certain DNA segments and certain non-DNA segments, specific mechanism for mRNA's resulting interactions with non-DNA entities, which in turn creates a specific polypeptide.
