= Spinach (disambiguation) =

Spinach (Spinacia oleracea) is an edible flowering plant in the family of Amaranthaceae.

Spinach may also refer to:

== Botany ==
- Amaranthus dubius, known as red spinach or Chinese spinach
- Atriplex hortensis, known as mountain spinach or French spinach
- Basella alba, known as Malabar spinach, red vine spinach, creeping spinach or climbing spinach
- Chard (Beta vulgaris), also known as spinach beet, silverbeet or perpetual spinach
- Chenopodium bonus-henricus, also known as Lincolnshire spinach
- Cleome serrulata, known as Navajo spinach
- Ipomoea aquatica, known as water spinach, river spinach or Chinese spinach
- Morogo, or African spinach, referring to a group of at least three different dark green leafy vegetables
- Rumex acetosa, also known as spinach dock
- Tetragonia tetragonioides, known as New Zealand spinach or sea spinach

== Other uses ==
- Spinach (moth) (Eulithis mellinata), a moth of the family Geometridae
- Spinach aptamer, a synthetic RNA aptamer designed as a mimic of green fluorescent protein
- Spinach (software), magnetic resonance simulation software

== See also ==
- Chinese spinach (disambiguation)
- Wild spinach
