= C7H6N2 =

The molecular formula C_{7}H_{6}N_{2} may refer to:

- Benzimidazole, a heterocyclic aromatic organic compound and colorless solid
- Indazole (also called isoindazole), a heterocyclic aromatic organic compound
- Phenyldiazomethane, (Diazomethyl)benzene
