= Fluorescent tag =

Biochemical identification method

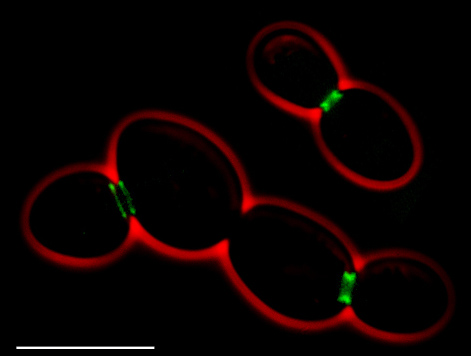
S. cerevisiae septins revealed with fluorescent microscopy utilizing fluorescent labeling

In molecular biology and biotechnology, a fluorescent tag, also known as a fluorescent dye, fluorescent label or fluorescent probe, is a molecule that is attached chemically to aid in the detection of a biomolecule such as a protein, antibody, or amino acid. Generally, fluorescent tagging, or labeling, uses a reactive derivative of a fluorescent molecule known as a fluorophore. The fluorophore selectively binds to a specific region or functional group on the target molecule and can be attached chemically or biologically. Various labeling techniques such as enzymatic labeling, protein labeling, and genetic labeling are widely utilized. Ethidium bromide, fluorescein and green fluorescent protein are common tags. The most commonly labelled molecules are antibodies, proteins, amino acids and peptides which are then used as specific probes for detection of a particular target.

== History ==
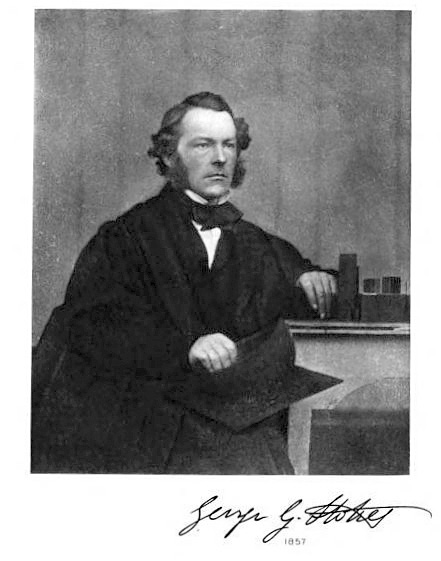
Stokes George G

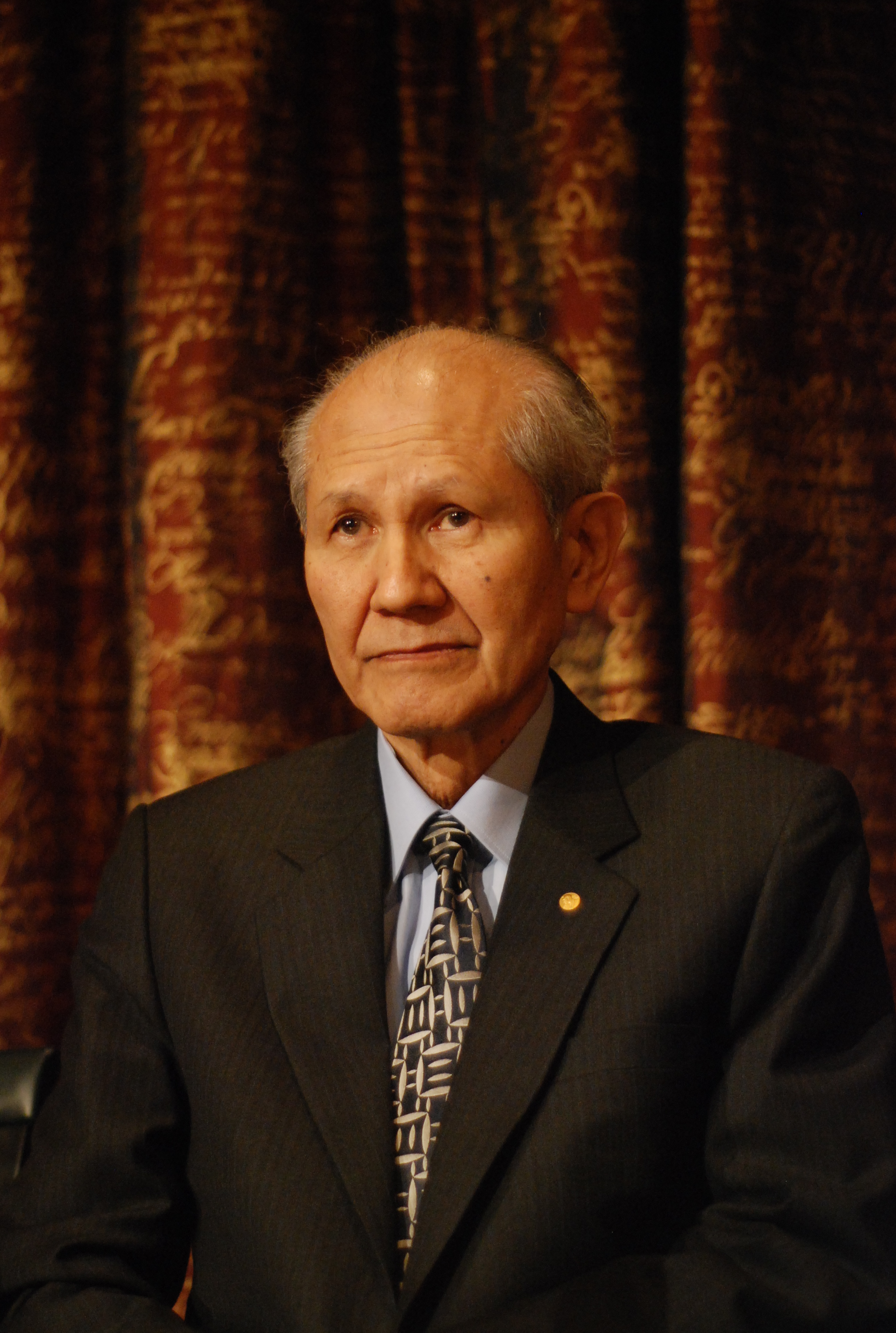
Osamu Shimomura-press conference Dec 06th, 2008-1

The development of methods to detect and identify biomolecules has been motivated by the ability to improve the study of molecular structure and interactions. Before the advent of fluorescent labeling, radioisotopes were used to detect and identify molecular compounds. Since then, safer methods have been developed that involve the use of fluorescent dyes or fluorescent proteins as tags or probes as a means to label and identify biomolecules. Although fluorescent tagging in this regard has only been recently utilized, the discovery of fluorescence has been around for a much longer time.

Sir George Stokes developed the Stokes Law of Fluorescence in 1852 which states that the wavelength of fluorescence emission is greater than that of the exciting radiation. Richard Meyer then termed fluorophore in 1897 to describe a chemical group associated with fluorescence. Since then, Fluorescein was created as a fluorescent dye by Adolph von Baeyer in 1871 and the method of staining was developed and utilized with the development of fluorescence microscopy in 1911.

Ethidium bromide and variants were developed in the 1950s, and in 1994, fluorescent proteins or FPs were introduced. Green fluorescent protein or GFP was discovered by Osamu Shimomura in the 1960s and was developed as a tracer molecule by Douglas Prasher in 1987. FPs led to a breakthrough of live cell imaging with the ability to selectively tag genetic protein regions and observe protein functions and mechanisms. For this breakthrough, Shimomura was awarded the Nobel Prize in 2008.

New methods for tracking biomolecules have been developed including the use of colorimetric biosensors, photochromic compounds, biomaterials, and electrochemical sensors. Fluorescent labeling is also a common method in which applications have expanded to enzymatic labeling, chemical labeling, protein labeling, and genetic labeling.

Types of biosensors

== Methods for tracking biomolecules ==
There are currently several labeling methods for tracking biomolecules. Some of the methods include the following.

=== Isotope markers ===
Common species that isotope markers are used for include proteins. In this case, amino acids with stable isotopes of either carbon, nitrogen, or hydrogen are incorporated into polypeptide sequences. These polypeptides are then put through mass spectrometry. Because of the exact defined change that these isotopes incur on the peptides, it is possible to tell through the spectrometry graph which peptides contained the isotopes. By doing so, one can extract the protein of interest from several others in a group. Isotopic compounds play an important role as photochromes, described below.

=== Colorimetric biosensors ===
Biosensors are attached to a substance of interest. Normally, this substance would not be able to absorb light, but with the attached biosensor, light can be absorbed and emitted on a spectrophotometer. Additionally, biosensors that are fluorescent can be viewed with the naked eye. Some fluorescent biosensors also have the ability to change color in changing environments (ex: from blue to red). A researcher would be able to inspect and get data about the surrounding environment based on what color he or she could see visibly from the biosensor-molecule hybrid species.

Colorimetric assays are normally used to determine how much concentration of one species there is relative to another.

=== Photochromic compounds ===
Photochromic compounds have the ability to switch between a range or variety of colors. Their ability to display different colors lies in how they absorb light. Different isomeric manifestations of the molecule absorbs different wavelengths of light, so that each isomeric species can display a different color based on its absorption. These include photoswitchable compounds, which are proteins that can switch from a non-fluorescent state to that of a fluorescent one given a certain environment.

The most common organic molecule to be used as a photochrome is diarylethene. Other examples of photoswitchable proteins include PADRON-C, rs-FastLIME-s and bs-DRONPA-s, which can be used in plant and mammalian cells alike to watch cells move into different environments.

=== Biomaterials ===
Fluorescent biomaterials are a possible way of using external factors to observe a pathway more visibly. The method involves fluorescently labeling peptide molecules that would alter an organism's natural pathway. When this peptide is inserted into the organism's cell, it can induce a different reaction. This method can be used, for example to treat a patient and then visibly see the treatment's outcome.

=== Electrochemical sensors ===
Electrochemical sensors can be used for label-free sensing of biomolecules. They detect changes and measure current between a probed metal electrode and an electrolyte containing the target analyte. A known potential to the electrode is then applied from a feedback current and the resulting current can be measured. For example, one technique using electrochemical sensing includes slowly raising the voltage causing chemical species at the electrode to be oxidized or reduced. Cell current vs voltage is plotted which can ultimately identify the quantity of chemical species consumed or produced at the electrode. Fluorescent tags can be used in conjunction with electrochemical sensors for ease of detection in a biological system.

=== Fluorescent labels ===
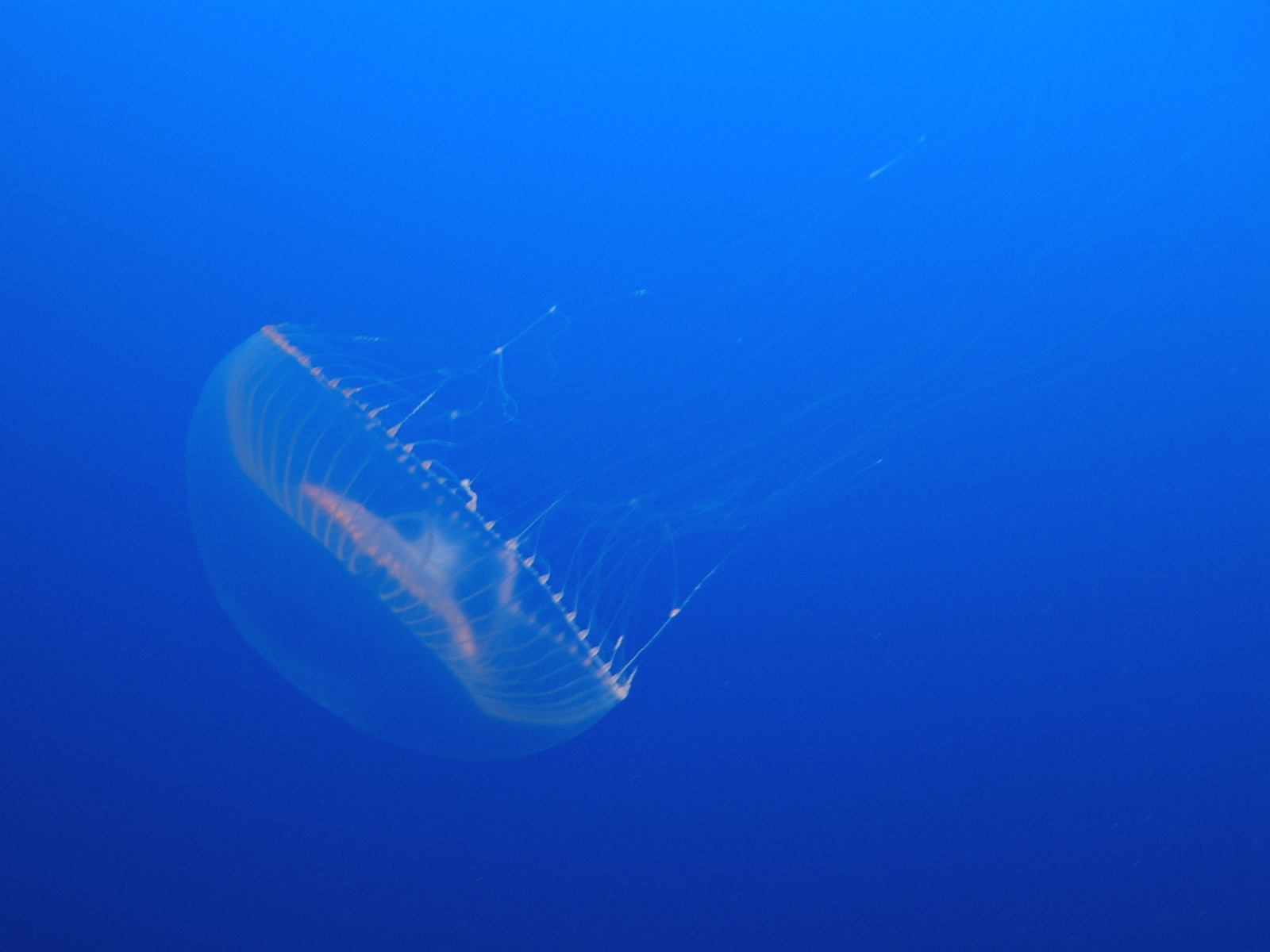
Aequorea victoria

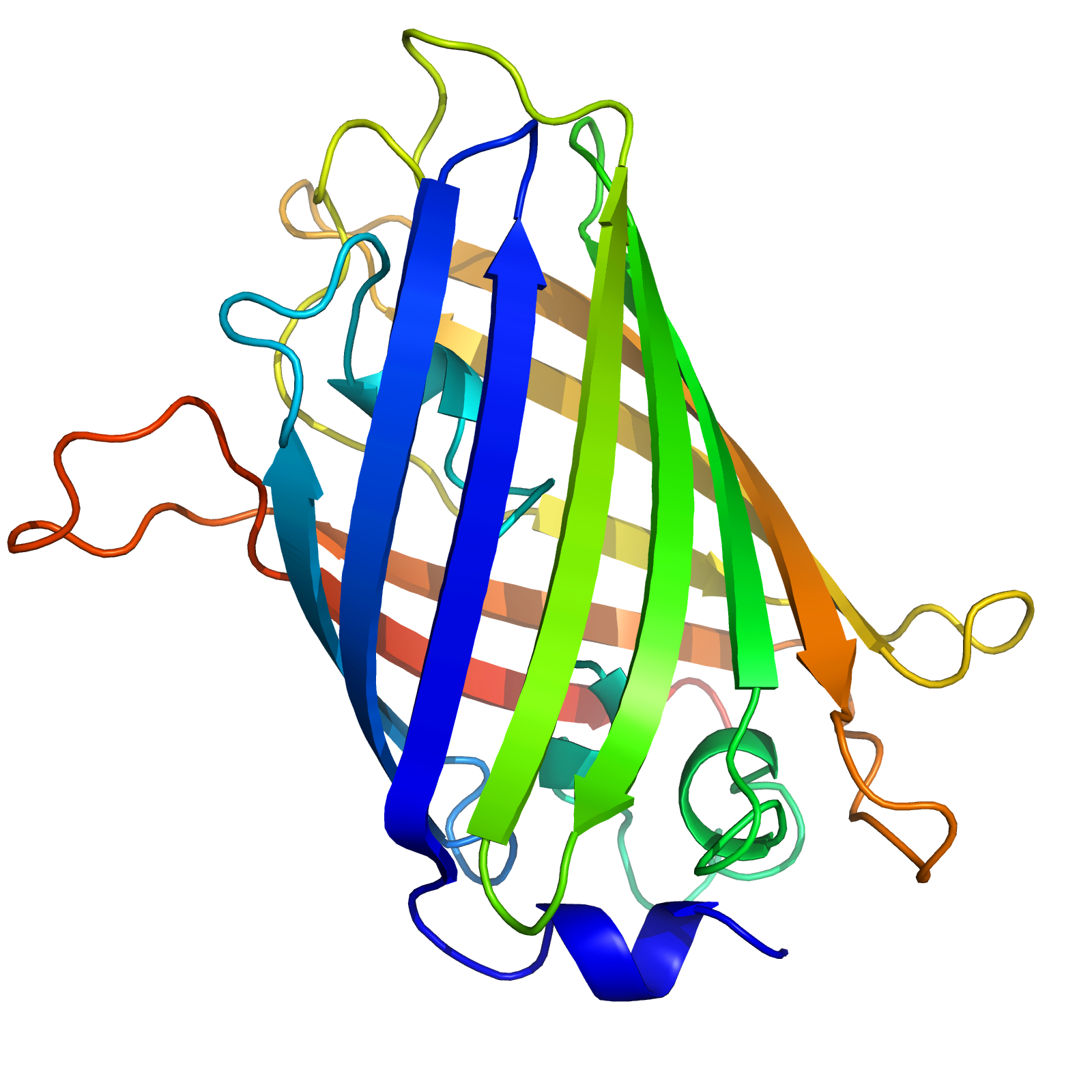
GFP structure

Of the various methods of labeling biomolecules, fluorescent labels are advantageous in that they are highly sensitive even at low concentration and non-destructive to the target molecule folding and function.

Green fluorescent protein is a naturally occurring fluorescent protein from the jellyfish Aequorea victoria that is widely used to tag proteins of interest. GFP emits a photon in the green region of the light spectrum when excited by the absorption of light. The chromophore consists of an oxidized tripeptide -Ser^65-Tyr^66-Gly^67 located within a β barrel. GFP catalyzes the oxidation and only requires molecular oxygen. GFP has been modified by changing the wavelength of light absorbed to include other colors of fluorescence. YFP or yellow fluorescent protein, BFP or blue fluorescent protein, and CFP or cyan fluorescent protein are examples of GFP variants. These variants are produced by the genetic engineering of the GFP gene.

Synthetic fluorescent probes can also be used as fluorescent labels. Advantages of these labels include a smaller size with more variety in color. They can be used to tag proteins of interest more selectively by various methods including chemical recognition-based labeling, such as utilizing metal-chelating peptide tags, and biological recognition-based labeling utilizing enzymatic reactions. However, despite their wide array of excitation and emission wavelengths as well as better stability, synthetic probes tend to be toxic to the cell and so are not generally used in cell imaging studies.

Fluorescent labels can be hybridized to mRNA to help visualize interaction and activity, such as mRNA localization. An antisense strand labeled with the fluorescent probe is attached to a single mRNA strand, and can then be viewed during cell development to see the movement of mRNA within the cell.

=== Fluorogenic labels ===
A fluorogen is a ligand (fluorogenic ligand) which is not itself fluorescent, but when it is bound by a specific protein or RNA structure becomes fluorescent.

For instance, FAST is a variant of photoactive yellow protein which was engineered to bind chemical mimics of the GFP tripeptide chromophore. Likewise, the spinach aptamer is an engineered RNA sequence which can bind GFP chromophore chemical mimics, thereby conferring conditional and reversible fluorescence on RNA molecules containing the sequence.

== Use of tags in fluorescent labeling ==
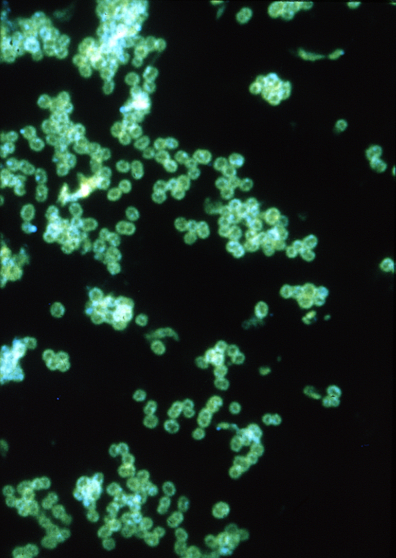
In a direct fluorescent antibody test, antibodies have been chemically linked to a fluorescent dye

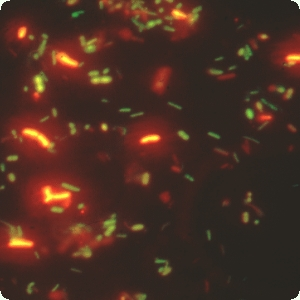
FISH image of bifidobacteria Cy3

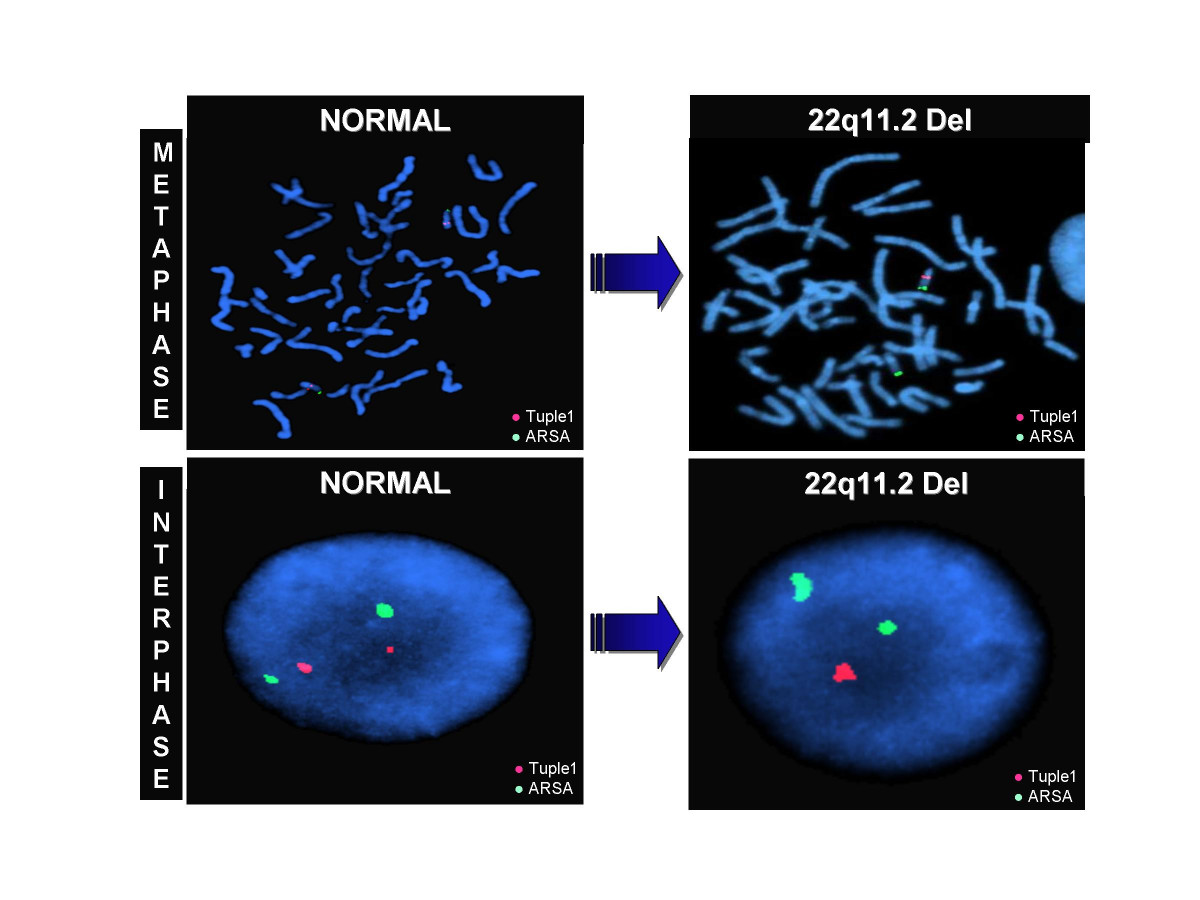
FISH analysis di george syndrome

Fluorescent labeling is known for its non-destructive nature and high sensitivity. This has made it one of the most widely used methods for labeling and tracking biomolecules. Several techniques of fluorescent labeling can be utilized depending on the nature of the target.

=== Enzymatic labeling ===
In enzymatic labeling, a DNA construct is first formed, using a gene and the DNA of a fluorescent protein. After transcription, a hybrid RNA + fluorescent is formed. The object of interest is attached to an enzyme that can recognize this hybrid DNA. Usually fluorescein is used as the fluorophore.

=== Chemical labeling ===
Chemical labeling or the use of chemical tags utilizes the interaction between a small molecule and a specific genetic amino acid sequence. Chemical labeling is sometimes used as an alternative for GFP. Synthetic proteins that function as fluorescent probes are smaller than GFP's, and therefore can function as probes in a wider variety of situations. Moreover, they offer a wider range of colors and photochemical properties. With recent advancements in chemical labeling, Chemical tags are preferred over fluorescent proteins due to the architectural and size limitations of the fluorescent protein's characteristic β-barrel. Alterations of fluorescent proteins would lead to loss of fluorescent properties.

=== Protein labeling ===
Protein labeling use a short tag to minimize disruption of protein folding and function. Transition metals are used to link specific residues in the tags to site-specific targets such as the N-termini, C-termini, or internal sites within the protein. Examples of tags used for protein labeling include biarsenical tags, Histidine tags, and FLAG tags.

=== Genetic labeling ===
Fluorescence in situ hybridization (FISH), is an example of a genetic labeling technique that utilizes probes that are specific for chromosomal sites along the length of a chromosome, also known as chromosome painting. Multiple fluorescent dyes that each have a distinct excitation and emission wavelength are bound to a probe which is then hybridized to chromosomes. A fluorescence microscope can detect the dyes present and send it to a computer that can reveal the karyotype of a cell. This technique allows abnormalities such as deletions and duplications to be revealed.

=== Analytical chemistry ===
Rhodamine, a fluorescent molecule often used in small molecule sensors

Small-molecule sensors is jargon for chemicals that detect certain metal ions in solution. Although many types exist, most small molecule sensors comprise a subunit that selectively binds to a metal that in turn induces a change in a fluorescent subunit. This change can be observed in the small molecule sensor's spectrum, which can be monitored using a detection system such as a microscope or a photodiode. Different probes exist for a variety of applications, each with different dissociation constants with respect to a particular metal, different fluorescent properties, and sensitivities. They probe biological processes by monitoring metal ions at low concentrations in biological systems. More traditional bio-sensing are less effective or not suitable. Most detection mechanisms involved in small molecule sensors involve fluorescence.

==== Mechanisms of detection ====
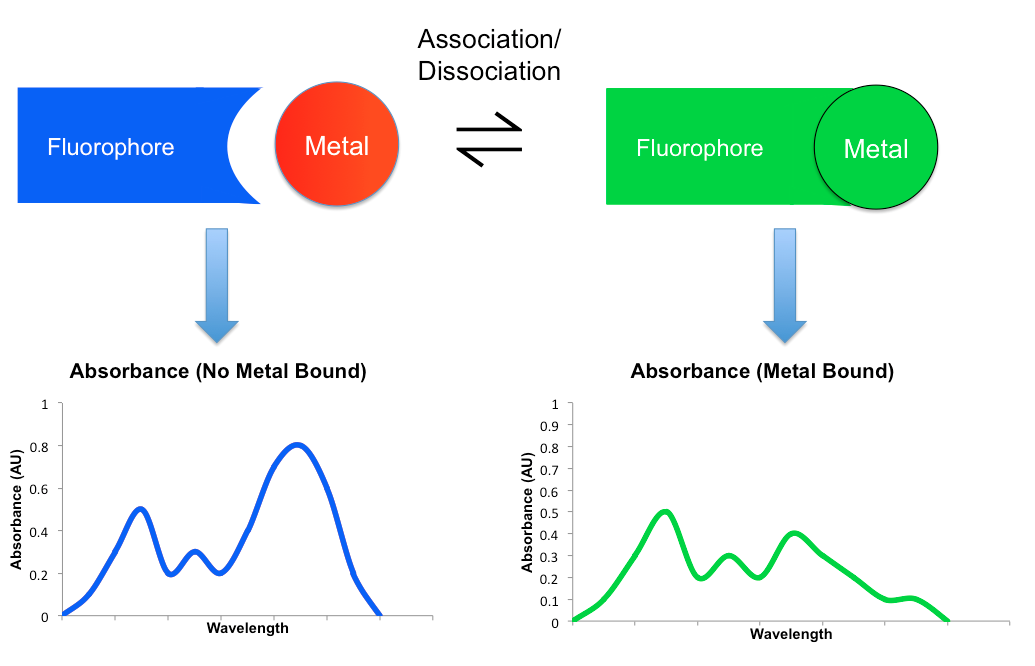
Cartoon depicting a shift in spectrum of a small molecule sensor upon the binding of a metal

- Paramagnetic Fluorescence Quenching, the allowance of new electronic states upon binding a paramagnetic metal atom
- Photoinduced Electron Transfer (PET), the blocking of a lower energy state due to the binding of a metal atom.
- Photoinduced Charge Transfer (PCT), the modulation of energy levels in a complex by charge transfer within a conjugated pi system.
- Fluorescence Resonance Energy Transfer (FRET), the transfer of an exciton from a donor to an acceptor, modulating the emission spectrum.
- Excimer/Exciplex formation, the formation of a state that is a hybrid of the ground and excited states. This has novel fluorescent properties.
- Chemodosimeters, complexes that undergo irreversible reactions with other species upon binding a metal to form new compounds with novel fluorescent spectra.

Fluorophores are essential to some measurement of the metal binding event, and indirectly, metal concentration. There are many types, all with different properties that make them advantageous for different applications. Some work as small metal sensors completely on their own while others must be complexed with a subunit that can chelate or bind a metal ion. Rhodamine for example undergoes a conformation change upon the binding of a metal ion. In so doing it switches between a colorless, non-fluorescent spirocyclic form to a fluorescent, pink open cyclic form. Quinoline based sensors have been developed that form luminescent complexes with Cd(II) and fluorescent ones with Zn(II). It is hypothesized to function by changing its lowest luminescent state from n–π* to π–π* when coordinating to a metal. When the Dansyl group DNS binds to a metal, it loses a sulfonamide hydrogen, causing fluorescence quenching via a PET or reverse PET mechanism in which an electron is transferred either to or from the metal that is bound.

Small molecule sensors for zinc have been reported. One example is "ZX1", a compound comprising a dipicolylamine (DPA) Zinc binding subunit that has greater affinity for Zinc than other species found in solution such as Ca and Mg. GFZnP OMe is an alternate, GFP-based fluorescent Zn2+ sensor is published for two-photon microscopy and related biological and microscop application. It composed of an 8-methoxyquinoline scaffold. It has excellent photophysical characteristics including a 37-fold fluorescence enhancement with l(ex) = 440 nm and l(em) = 505 nm. The two-photon cross-section is as high as 73 GM at 880 nm. GFZnP BIPY features a 2,2'-bipyridine chelator moiety. It was effective at physiologically relevant pH-range and excellent photophysical characteristics are reported, including a 53-fold fluorescence enhancement with excitation and emission maxima at 422 nm and 492 nm, respectively. High two-photon cross-section of 3.0 GM at 840 nm as well as excellent metal ion selectivity are reported. In vitro experiments on HEK 293 cell culture were carried out using two-photon microscopy demonstrating the applicability.

For copper, the CTAP-1 sensor shows a response in the UV region when Cu(I) binds to an azatetrathiacrown motif that in turn excites a pyrazoline-based dye that is attached. In Coppersensor-1 (CS1), a thioether-rich motif binds to Cu(I) causing the excitation of a boron-dipyrromethene (BODIPY) dye in the visible region.

Iron sensors include Pryrene-TEMPO, in which the binding of iron to TEMPO quenches the fluorescence of pyrene when no Fe(II) is bound. Upon binding however, TEMPO is reduced and pyrene regains fluorescence. This probe is limited in that an analogous response can be generated by unwanted free radicals, and that it can only by used in acidic solution. The DansSQ Fe(II)-binding system consists of a Dansyl group bound to styrylquinoline and operates by the disruption of intra-molecular charge transfer. It is limited in that it is only soluble in acetonitrile in 10% H_{2}O.

Cobalt sensors have been made that capitalize on the breaking of C-O bonds by Co(II) in a fluorescent probe known as Cobalt Probe 1 (CP1).

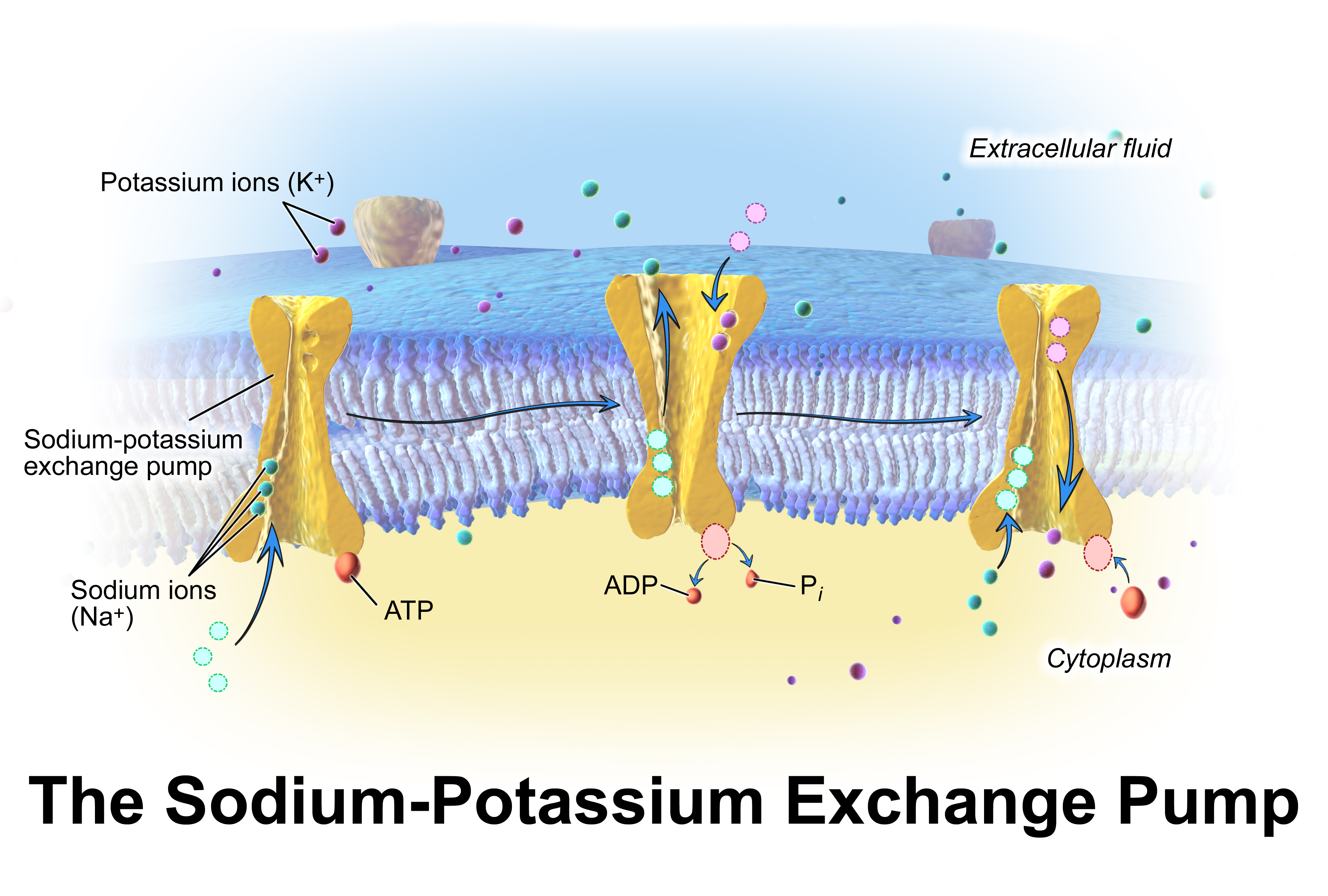
A Sodium-Potassium pump that causes changing concentrations of metal ions in a biological system.

Potential applications can be envisioned for detecing mercury in fish. Some mercury sensors (MS) are complexes of fluorescein and napthofluorescein. The MS1 probe increases its emission upon binding of Hg(II), while maintaining great affinity for mercury over other heavy metal ions. The S3 sensor is based on a BODIPY complex which undergoes a significant increase in fluorescence upon the binding of Hg(II). MF1 uses a soft thioether chelator for Hg(II) bound to a fluorescein-like xanthenone reporter. It has good contrast upon binding mercury and good selectivity. MF1 is sensitive enough that it has been proposed to be used to test fish for toxic levels of mercury.

== Cell imaging ==
Chemical tags have been tailored for imaging technologies more so than fluorescent proteins because chemical tags can localize photosensitizers closer to the target proteins. Proteins can then be labeled and detected with imaging such as super-resolution microscopy, Ca^{2+}-imaging, pH sensing, hydrogen peroxide detection, chromophore assisted light inactivation, and multi-photon light microscopy. In vivo imaging studies in live animals have been performed for the first time with the use of a monomeric protein derived from the bacterial haloalkane dehalogenase known as the Halo-tag. The Halo-tag covalently links to its ligand and allows for better expression of soluble proteins.

== Advantages ==
Although fluorescent dyes may not have the same sensitivity as radioactive probes, they are able to show real-time activity of molecules in action. Moreover, radiation and appropriate handling is no longer a concern.

With the development of fluorescent tagging, fluorescence microscopy has allowed the visualization of specific proteins in both fixed and live cell images. Localization of specific proteins has led to important concepts in cellular biology such as the functions of distinct groups of proteins in cellular membranes and organelles. In live cell imaging, fluorescent tags enable movements of proteins and their interactions to be monitored.

Latest advances in methods involving fluorescent tags have led to the visualization of mRNA and its localization within various organisms. Live cell imaging of RNA can be achieved by introducing synthesized RNA that is chemically coupled with a fluorescent tag into living cells by microinjection. This technique was used to show how the oskar mRNA in the Drosophila embryo localizes to the posterior region of the oocyte.

== See also ==
- Molecular tagging velocimetry
- Spectrophotometer for Nucleic Acid Measurements
- Protein tags
