= Benzylidene compounds =

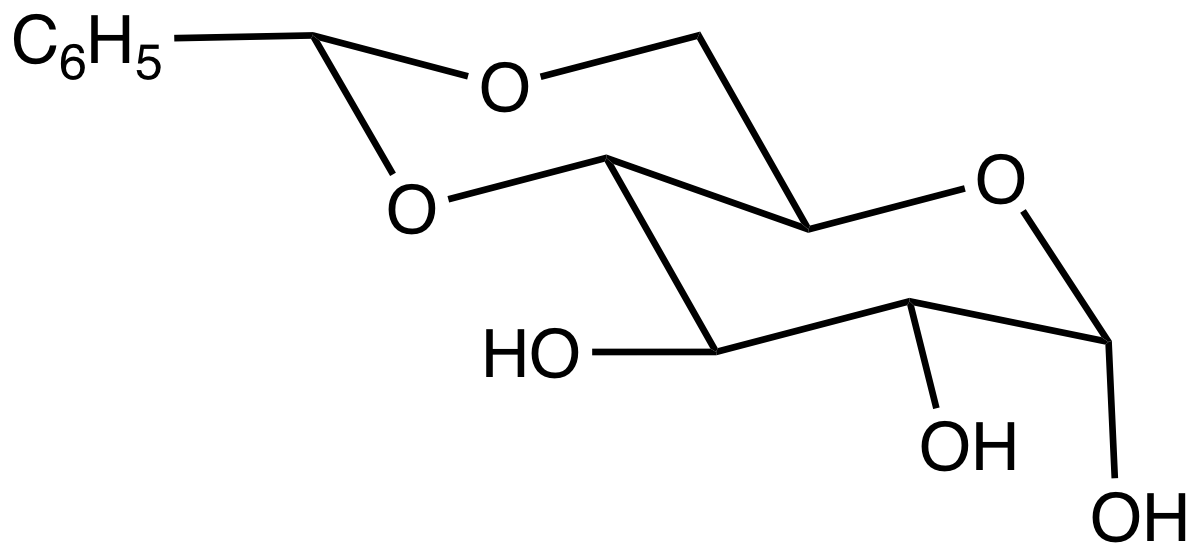
Benzylidene acetal of glucose.

Benzylidene compounds are, formally speaking, derivatives of benzylidene, although few are prepared from the carbene. Benzylidene acetal is a protecting group in synthetic organic chemistry of the form PhCH(OR)_{2}. For example, 4,6-O-benzylidene-glucopyranose is a glucose derivative. Benzylidene is an archaic term for compounds of the type PhCHX_{2} and PhCH= substituents (Ph = C_{6}H_{5}). For example, dibenzylideneacetone is (PhCH=CH)_{2}CO. Benzal chloride, PhCHCl_{2}, is alternatively named benzylidene chloride.

Benzylidene is the molecule C_{6}H_{5}CH. It is a triplet carbene (CAS RN 3101-08-4). It is generated by irradiation of phenyldiazomethane.

== See also ==
- Aurone
- 3,5-Difluoro-4-hydroxybenzylidene imidazolinone
