= RNA timestamp =

RNA editing application

An RNA timestamp is a technology that enables the age of any given RNA transcript to be inferred by exploiting RNA editing. In this technique, the RNA of interest is tagged to an adenosine rich reporter motif that consists of multiple MS2 binding sites. These MS2 binding sites recruit a complex composed of ADAR2 (adenosine deaminase acting on RNA catalytic 2 domain) and MCP (MS2 capsid protein). The binding of the ADAR2 enzyme to the RNA timestamp initiates the gradual conversion of adenosine to inosine molecules. Over time, these edits accumulate and are then read through RNA-seq. This technology allows us to glean cell-type specific temporal information associated with RNA-seq data, that until now, has not been accessible.

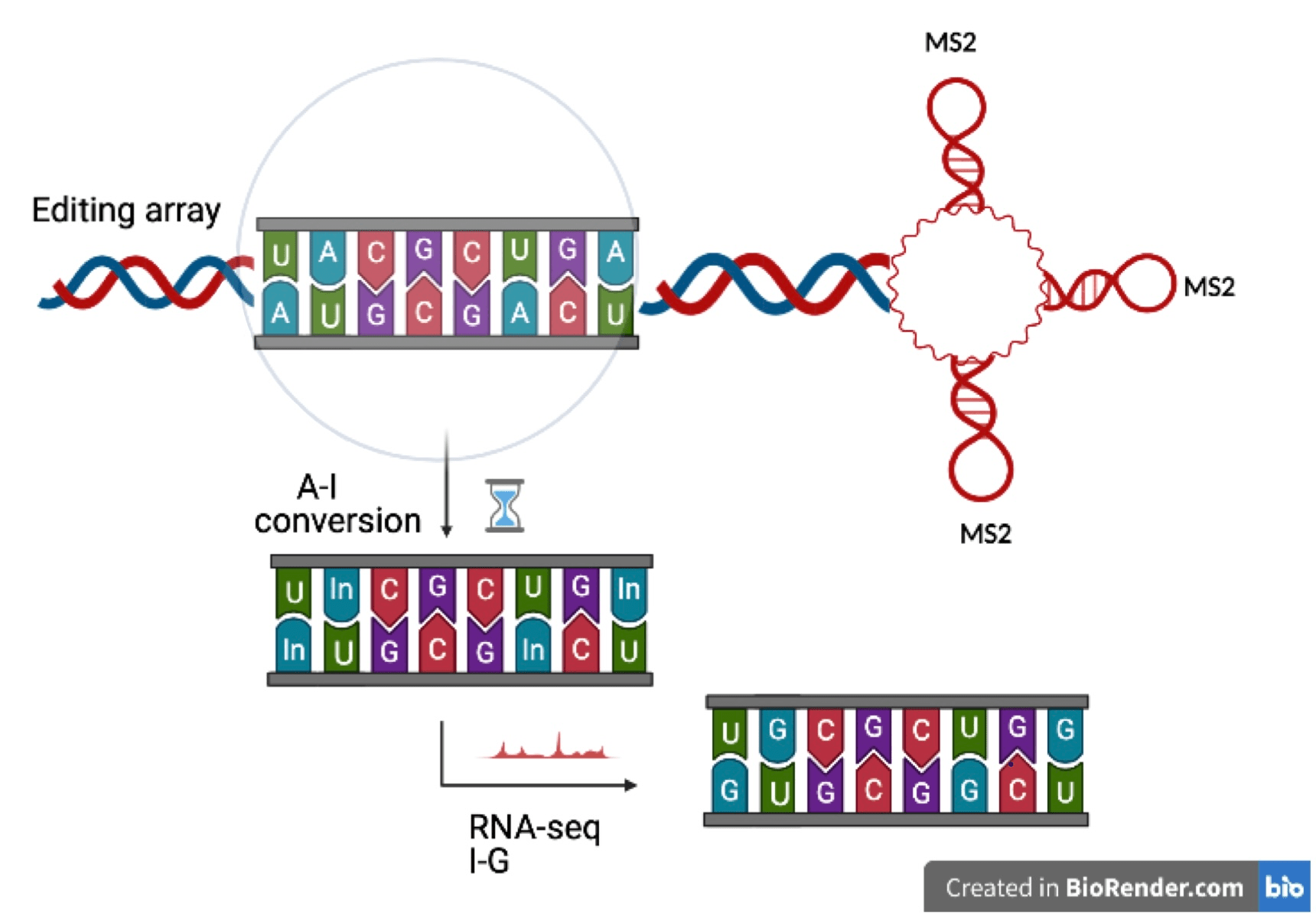
A schematic representation of one timestamp with repetitive RNA motifs and MS2 binding sites. Adenosines gradually convert to inosines and are ultimately read as guanosines after RNA-sequencing.

== Background ==
The advent of RNA-sequencing (RNA-seq) in 2009 allowed for a deeper look into the biology of unique cell types by allowing researchers to examine the presence and quantity of RNA in a sample at any given time. The ability for analysis of the transcriptome has revealed valuable information about cellular differences and transcriptional changes between cell types. Further, RNA-seq has provided insights into examining alternative gene splicing, post-transcriptional modification and fusion genes – all of which would go undetected with genome analysis alone. The missing piece of the puzzle is understanding temporally when genes are expressed in a cell. RNA-seq requires the destruction of the cell, thus only revealing the transcriptome at a single moment. Understanding expression times and patterns of genes transcription would create a deeper understanding of the roles of genes and how regulation of expression timing could be affecting cellular processes and possible dysregulation could be contributing to disease development.

In recent years, there have been other technologies created with the end goal of determining the age of RNA transcripts within a given cell. For example, TimeLapse-seq, SLAM-seq as well as measuring RNA velocity which is the instantaneous change in cell state from unspliced transcripts. However, these methods were only able to reveal the age of transcripts at a fixed time point and failed to measure transcript age from more than one transcriptional pulse. While this information has importance, the ability to capture the dynamic transcriptional changes within a cell remained elusive.

The research groups of Edward Boyden at MIT and Fei Chen at Harvard, both in Cambridge, Massachusetts, U.S.A, developed RNA timestamps, a new (2020) method that allows the age chosen transcripts in a cell to be inferred. This technology provides the means to understand cellular biology at a new level and deepen our understanding of cellular processes and transcriptional regulation. Further, the use of RNA timestamps does not require lysis of the cell which is an undeniable advantage. This allows timestamps to have the unique availability to suggest information from multiple transcriptional pulses throughout the cellular development rather than being limited to a fixed time point.

== Methods ==
1. A RNA timestamp is a repetitive reporter RNA motif that gradually undergoes adenosine to inosine (A-to-I) edits. RNA timestamps are specifically designed to be arrays of adenosine-rich sequences with MS2 binding sites, which are stem loops in the editing region of the timestamps. An RNA timestamp can be tagged to a RNA of interest, thus new RNA timestamps will be generated with transcriptional pulses of the gene of interest.
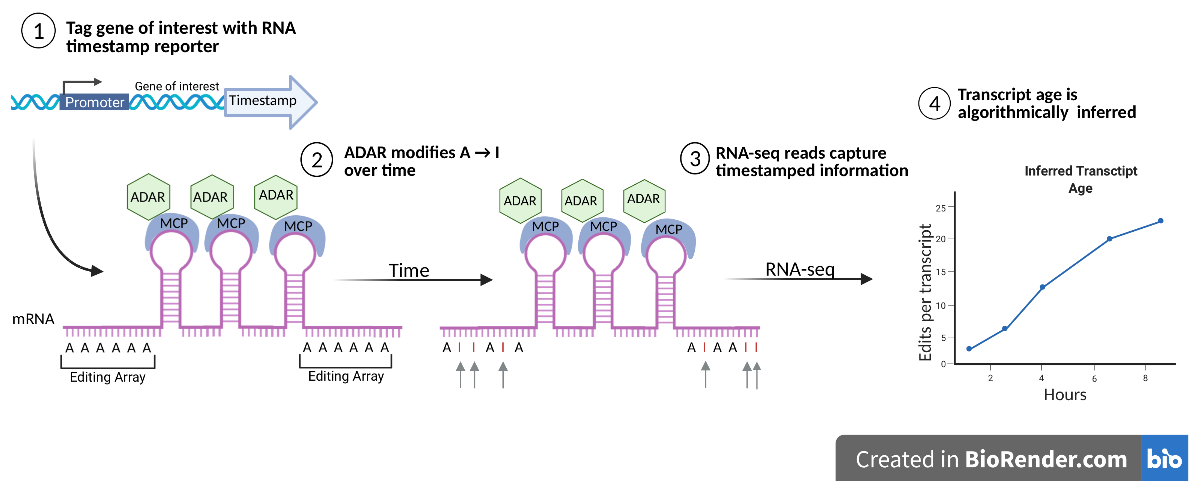
  A workflow schematic of RNA timestamps represented in 4 steps (adapted from image by Rodriques et al.) 1- depicts tagging the RNA of interest. 2-shows the RNA timestamp: three MS2 binding domains with repetitive adenosine editing regions that ADARcd2 (shown as ADAR) binds in order to convert A-to-I overtime. 3 & 4 - analysis steps.
2. ADAR is an important enzyme in this technology as it edits adenosine to inosine (A-to-I). RNA timestamps use a genetically engineered version of this enzyme: ADAR2cd (human adenosine deaminase acting on RNA 2 catalytic domain). The ADAR2cd enzyme is targeted to specifically bind to MS2 sites, through fusion with the MS2 capsid protein (MCP). ADAR2cd thus binds to tagged RNA and causes A-to-I edits that accumulate over time. Adenosine is the main substrate of ADAR, so the adenosine rich sequences that flank the MS2 binding sites provide an excellent mechanism to facilitate A-to-I edits.
3. From here, high-throughput sequencing can be used to collect the information from the RNA timestamps. Sequencing will reveal A-to-I changes as adenosine-to-guanine mutations because inosine is non-conventional in RNA. This allows for temporal information about the RNA of interest to be incorporated into RNA-seq experiments.
4. Algorithmically, the age of the timestamped RNA can be inferred by estimating the total number of adenosine-to-inosine edits on the mRNA transcripts. This allows for inferall of transcript age with hour-scale accuracy.

Since multiple timestamped RNA transcripts are produced in the cells by a specific promoter, a transcriptional program was developed that uses a gradient descent algorithm to describe the number of timestamps generated as a function of time. This helps with determining the source of the time point for the RNA timestamps and the accuracy of the algorithm increased with the number of RNAs. Further, this reveals the time point at which the specific promoter was active.

RNA timestamp experiments were first experimentally validated in HEK293T cells that expressed the ADAR variant along with time stamped RNA under the control of tetracycline response element (TRE) induced by doxycycline. From these experiments, it was shown that the age of multiple RNA transcripts can be accurately determined (with a 95% confidence interval of 2.7±0.4h).

== Applications ==
=== Current ===
As part of their proof of concept experiments, the researchers showed that timestamps can be used in primary hippocampal neuron cell culture to infer the c-fos response from KCl activation of neural activity.

This technology was also shown to have the potential to determine transcriptional events in individual cells. Timestamps can be read out when used in combination with high throughput single-cell droplet based methods thus allowing RNA timestamps to be used for applications like ordering of mRNAs based on the timing of transcriptional processes based on cell type, and determining whether a specific promoter was active.

=== Future ===
RNA timestamp technology provides a novel means to understand cellular transcription. Only a few months after this technology was described, Dr. Michael Gilhooey and colleagues in England discussed RNA timestamps as an interesting new perspective to apply to their research on inherited optic neuropathies. This suggests diverse potential applications of RNA timestamps, and perhaps it will be beneficial to better understanding transcriptional changes in human diseases, as alluded to by Dr. Gilhooey.

Further, the researchers suggested that perhaps timestamps could be calibrated to be used in in vivo experiments. The researchers have also suggested a potential mechanism using a virus to deliver the RNA reporter to target cells in vivo. This could provide a revolutionary mechanism to track expression dynamics during development or recording responses to stimuli in vivo. However, for now, timestamps are limited to in vitro experiments.

== Limitations ==
Despite the many advantages of this method, there are some caveats of RNA timestamping worth mentioning:

1. Only RNAs that are tagged with the timestamps can be read through this technique
2. The timestamping technique would yield different results with RNAs having varying half lives. The researchers hope to create a mechanism in which faster editing could be possible: this would be beneficial for RNA with shorter half lives and improve the resolution to a time point more precise than hours
3. Genetic engineering is required to tag the promoter of interest
4. The researchers are unsure if the calibration in one system, for example cell culture, could be utilized to decode information obtained from other systems, like in vivo.
5. In more complex and slower transcriptional processes, the transcriptional programming algorithm would need thousands of timestamped RNAs to decode the original timepoints. This might prove to be laborious and expensive.
