= NcRNA therapy =

Use of non-coding RNA to treat disease

A majority of the human genome is made up of non-protein coding DNA. It infers that such sequences are not commonly employed to encode for a protein. However, even though these regions do not code for protein, they have other functions and carry necessary regulatory information.They can be classified based on the size of the ncRNA. Small noncoding RNA is usually categorized as being under 200 bp in length, whereas long noncoding RNA is greater than 200bp. In addition, they can be categorized by their function within the cell; Infrastructural and Regulatory ncRNAs. Infrastructural ncRNAs seem to have a housekeeping role in translation and splicing and include species such as rRNA, tRNA, snRNA.Regulatory ncRNAs are involved in the modification of other RNAs.

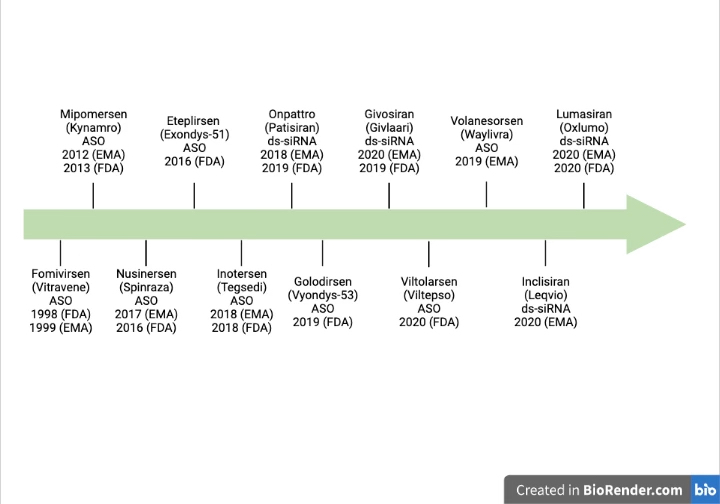
Timeline of ncRNA therapeutics

== RNA Classification ==
=== Long non-coding RNA ===
Long non-coding RNA (LncRNA) are a type of RNA which is usually defined as transcripts which are greater than 200 base-pairs in length and not translated into proteins. This limitation distinguishes lncRNA from small non-coding RNAs which encompasses microRNAs (miRNAs), small interfering RNAs (siRNAs), Piwi-interacting RNAs (piRNAs), small nucleolar RNAs (snoRNAs), and other short RNAs. Long non-coding RNAs include lincRNAs, intronic ncRNAs, circular and linear ncRNA.

==== Long intergenic Non-coding RNA ====
Long intergenic Non-coding RNA (LincRNA) is defined as RNA transcripts that are longer than 200 nucleotides. These RNAs must not have open reading frames that encode proteins. The term “intergenic” refers to the identification of these transcripts from regions of the genome that do not contain protein-encoding genes. LncRNAs also contain promoter - or enhancer-associated RNAs that are gene proximal and can be either in the sense or antisense orientation.

==== Circular RNA ====
Circular RNA (CircRNA) are a novel class of endogenous noncoding RNAs and are characterized by their covalently closed loop structures. This class of ncRNA does not have a 5’ cap or 3’ Poly A tail. It has been hypothesized that cirRNAs may function as potential molecular markers for disease diagnosis and treatment and play an important role in the initiation and progression of human diseases.

=== Small non-coding RNA ===
Small non-coding RNA (sncRNA) are a type of RNA. which is usually defined as transcripts which are lesser than 200 base-pairs in length and not translated into proteins. This limitation distinguishes sncRNA from lncRNA. This class includes but is not limited to microRNAs (miRNAs), small interfering RNAs (siRNAs), Piwi-interacting RNAs (piRNAs), small nucleolar RNAs (snoRNAs), and other short RNAs.

==== microRNA ====
microRNA (miRNA) plays an important role in regulating gene expression. Majority of miRNAs are transcribed from DNA sequences into primary miRNAs. These primary miRNAs are further processed into precursor miRNAs, and finally into mature miRNAs. The miRNAs in most cases interact with the 3’ UTR region of target to induce mRNA degradation and translational repression. Interactions of miRNAs with other regions, including the 5’ UTR, coding sequence, and gene promoters have also been reported. Under certain conditions, miRNAs are also able to activate translation or regulate transcription, but this is dependent on factors such as location of the effect. This process of interaction is very dynamic and dependent on multiple factors.

==== Ribosomal RNA ====
Ribosomal RNA (rRNA) includes non-coding RNAs that play essential roles in rRNA regulation. Ribosomal RNA (rRNA) takes part in protein synthesis. Occasional RNA molecules act catalytically, as RNA enzymes (ribozymes) or take part in protein export. The most important ribozyme is the major rRNA of the large subunit of the ribosome (28s rRNA in eukaryotes). It is now accepted that 28S rRNA catalyzes the critical step in polypeptide synthesis in addition to playing a major structural role.

==== Small nuclear RNA and small nucleolar RNA ====
Small nuclear RNA (snRNA) and small nucleolar RNA (snoRNA) are widely known to guide the nucleotide modifications and processing of rRNA. Both snRNA and snoRNA are categorized into a class of small RNA molecules that are present in the nucleus. However, they vary a lot by function. snRNA are 80-350nucletides long while snoRNA are 80-1000 nucleotides long in yeast. snRNA plays a critical role in regulating the pre-mRNA silencing. On the other hand, snoRNAs are involved in mRNA editing, modification of the rRNA and tRNA, and genome imprinting. Major function of snoRNA includes the maturation of rRNA during ribosomal formation. Small nuclear and small nucleolar RNAs are critical components of snRNPs and snoRNPs and play an essential role in the maturation of, respectively, mRNAs and rRNAs within the nucleus of eukaryotic cells. Both snRNA and snoRNA are involved in modifying RNA just after transcription. snRNA can be found in splicing speckles and Cajal bodies of the nucleus of the cell.snRNA and snoRNA requires a phosphorylated adaptor for nuclear export (PHAX) to get transported to the site of action within the nucleus.

==== Transfer RNA ====
Transfer RNA (tRNA) helps decode a messenger RNA sequence into a protein. They function at specific sites within the ribosome during translation (the process going from code to protein). Within the mRNA molecule we have three nucleotides in length codons. These codons all have a unique universal code which represents a particular amino acid. tRNAs can be classified as an adaptor molecule, being typically 76 to 90 nucleotides in length.

== History ==
=== Non-coding RNA ===
DNA purification in 1869 by Dr. Friedrich Miescher’s, from salmon sperm and pus cells guided the scientists towards the presence of additional molecules in the cell except for proteins. Miescher identified the presence of a highly acidic molecule that he isolated from the pus cells and labeled it “nuclein”. The term was coined as the DNA isolated by Miescher was not protein and was derived from the nucleus of the cell. It wasn’t until 1944, when Oswald Avery proposed the DNA as a genetic carrier of information that the Miescher discovery was brought back to light.

Following the X-ray crystallography, by Rosalind Franklin and the determination of DNA double helix by Watson and Crick in 1953, further enhanced the understanding of DNA structure and allowed for the establishment of central dogma of molecular biology. However, one of the flaws with central dogma was the postulation that information flow proceeds from DNA to RNA to protein, which hinders the understanding of different regulatory mechanisms.

In 1955, George Palade identified the first ncRNA as a part of the large ribonucleoprotein complex (RNP). The second class of ncRNA to be discovered was transfer RNA (tRNA) in 1957. However, the first regulatory ncRNA was a microRNA discovered in 1988 from E.coli and was labeled as micF. On other hand, the first eukaryotic microRNA was discovered in C.elegans in 1993. It was derived from gene lin-4 and was identified as a small RNA molecule (as compared to longer mRNA molecules) forming stem-loop structures. This structure gets further modified to generate a shorter RNA that is complementary to the 3’UTR region of lin-14 transcript. This pathway allowed for a better understanding of different post translational gene silencing pathways. Since then, many other miRNAs have been discovered.

Detailed understanding of the mechanism behind this post translational silencing pathway was established in 2001 by Thomas Tuschl. It was discovered that the double stranded RNA gets processed into a shorter 25 nucleotides long fragment which is then modified into a short hairpin like structure by Drosha complex. The molecule is then diced by dicer enzymes into a functional double stranded RNA (dsRNA). These are then loaded onto the RISC complex which then finds and cleaves the targeted mRNA of interest in the cytoplasm.

It wasn’t until 1989 that the imprinting genes were discovered and the genome imprinting was established. The first two genomic imprinting genes were paternally expressed Igf2r and H19. These were both discovered independently in mice and were localized to chromosome 7. H19 is peculiar as it functions as a lncRNA but undergoes modifications similar to that of pre-mRNA processing such as splicing, 3’ polyadenylation and is transcribed by RNA polymerase II. This lncRNA plays a significant role in mice embryonic development and can be lethal if expressed during prenatal stages. More lncRNAs have been discovered in eukaryotes over time. One such discovery that allowed for better understanding between H19 functions was a lncRNA called XIST (X inactive-specific transcript).

=== ncRNA drugs and therapy ===
The first ncRNA therapeutic drug approved by food and drug administration (FDA) (1998) and the European medicine agency (EMA) (1999) is called Fomivirsen or Vitravene. The target organ is the eye and works against the cytomegalovirus (CMV) retinitis in immunocompromised patients. The drug functions as an antisense oligonucleotide and binds to the complementary sequence of the mRNA that inhibits the replication of human cytomegalovirus. This therapy can also be categorized as Antisense oligonucleotide (ASO) therapy. There have been many ASO RNA therapeutics that have been approved by FDA and/or EMA over the years, but it wasn’t until 2018 that the EMA approved the drug called Patisiran/Onpattro. The drug uses ds-siRNA as a mechanism of action and is deemed effective against hereditary transthyretin amyloidosis. The mechanism specifically targets the Transthyretin (TTR) mRNA. RNA therapeutic targets are not limited to mature mRNA but have been used to target mRNA at different stages of maturation. One such example is Nusinersen (Spinaraza), it functions as an ASO and targets pre-mRNA before splicing that corresponds to Survival of motor neuron 2 gene (SMN 2). This drug therapy was approved by FDA and EMA in 2016 and 2017 respectively. There are some drugs that have been approved by FDA and not by EMA. This can be seen in the case of an ASO type therapeutics called Eteplirsen (Exondys51) which has been approved by FDA in 2016 but not by EMA. It targets pre-mRNA corresponding to Dystrophin (DMD) and works against Duchenne muscular dystrophy. There are many additional therapeutics that have been developed and are either in phase I or II of the clinical trials. Current RNA therapeutics in clinical trials range from a variety of target organs and diseases ranging from skin (potential treatment for disease such as keloid) to tumors (squamous cell lung cancer).

To date, for both the FDA and the EMA, ncRNAs are considered as "simple" medical products because of their production by chemical synthesis. When some of them, produced biologically (known as bioengineered ncRNA agents: BERAs), will be put on the market, the status of biological medical products will be applied, which could lead to inconsistencies in the legislation.

== Applications ==
=== Antisense oligonucleotides ===
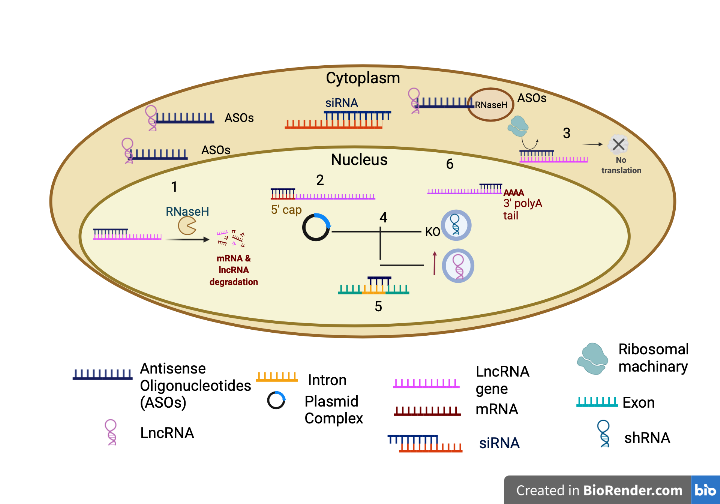
Antisense Oligonucleotide Use in ncRNA therapy

Antisense oligonucleotides (ASOs) are single-stranded DNA molecules with full complementarity to one select target mRNA and may act by blocking protein translation (via steric hindrance), causing mRNA degradation (via RNase H-cleavage) or changing pre-mRNA splicing. These short oligonucleotides have already been approved by the FDA for ten genetic disorders and many are currently in the pipeline to be approved/tested. Using oligonucleotide technology, we are now able to control protein expression via RNA interference, and are able to affect previously defined “undruggable” proteins. Even though this therapy has a lot of promise and potential, it comes with many limitations.

Compared to siRNA and microRNA, ASOs are more versatile in reducing protein expression, they have the ability to also enhance target translation. ASOs can also be customized with ease and accuracy, allowing for the targeting of virtually any mutated gene. This allows for a greater level of application in the field of precision and personalized medicine. The main challenge of ASO therapies to specific tissues and cellular uptake is what poses a great challenge and limitation. Liposomal delivery is one such way to overcome such issues. Liposomal delivery system comes with its own share of limitations. Serum proteins in the bloodstream destabilize the lipoprotein. This destabilization leads to the depletion of protein and exposing cargo to the unstable environment. This hindrance can be overcome by using PEGs (poly(ethylene glycol) . However, PEGs are not biodegradable causing them to accumulate within the body leading to adverse effects and causing hypersensitivity. In addition, multiple rounds of therapy with PEGs can lead to the formation of PEG antibodies, which can lead to lack of efficiency in preventing the rupture of the liposome that it is attached to. Using immunoliposomes it has been shown that targeting can be more specific as by using antibody’s specific to the protein of expression in that area, it results in the ASO drug directly impact the target site and nowhere else. Moreover, immunoliposomes are slow to dissociate leading to precise release of the ASO drug which they encapsulate.

=== LncRNA as a therapeutic approach ===
Long noncoding RNAs (lncRNAs) are large transcripts (more than 200 nucleotides long) that have similar mechanism of synthesis as that of mRNAs but unlike mRNAs, lncRNAs are not translated to a protein. lncRNA contains interactor elements and structural elements. Interactor elements directly interact with other nucleic acids or proteins while the structural elements indicate the ability of some lncRNAs to form secondary and/or tertiary structures. This ability of the lncRNAs to interact with nucleic acids using its interactor elements and its ability to interact with protein using its secondary structures allows it to function in a more diverse manner than other ncRNAs such as miRNA (microRNA). LncRNA has been established to play a role in gene regulation by influencing the ability of specific regions of the gene to bind to transcriptional elements and different epigenetic modifications. One such example can be seen in the case X inactive specific transcript (XIST). In humans, 46,XX females carry an extra X chromosome (155Mb of DNA) compared to 46,XY males. To overcome this dosage imbalance, one X chromosome is randomly inactivated in human females at around the 2-8 cell stage of embryo development. This inactivation is very stable across cell divisions due to epigenetic contributions both during the initial silencing and the subsequent maintenance of the inactive X chromosome (Xi). This inactivation is carried by the lncRNA, XIST. XIST is produced in cis and inactivates the X-chromosome that it has been generated from. The inactive X chromosome can be observed as a condensed heterochromatin structure called “Barr Body”. A study in 2013 utilized this ability of XIST as a potential therapeutic approach for treatment of trisomy 21. Trisomy 21 is commonly known as down syndrome and is caused due to presence of an additional copy of chromosome 21. The study was one of its kind as no other studies have been able to incorporate the XIST gene into a chromosome due to its large size. The study incorporated the XIST into one of the chromosomes 21 in the cells gathered from patients with down syndrome. The study was able to observe the inactivation of one of chromosome 21 in the form of a condensed heterochromatin and labeled it as a chromosome 21 barr body. Such experiments have shown to work in cells in the lab setting although no lncRNA based therapeutics are in clinical trials. The implications of such work can bring trisomy 21 and other chromosomal disorders in the realm of consideration for future gene therapy research.

== Challenges ==
One of the major issues that hinders the ncRNA therapy is the stability of the single stranded RNA molecule. RNA is typically single stranded therefore slightly unstable as compared to dsDNA molecules. This however can be overcome by fabricating the single stranded RNA to double stranded RNA(dsRNA). This is quite effective as the dsRNA is more stable at room temperature and has a longer shelf life. Second major issue is the cell/tissue/organ specific targeting of the RNA molecules. Generally, this is overcome by containing the dsRNA in a lipid nanoparticle and using that as a ligand to bind to a receptor on the surface of the target cell. The lipid particles are taken into the liver cells through their specific receptors and this mechanism seems to be effective at targeting the liver cells/cancer. Another organ with a relatively easy delivery mechanism is the eye. This requires an invasive technique of directly injecting the ncRNA of interest directly into the eye. These techniques are not only invasive but also don’t ensure if all the cells in the target organ are being targeted by the ncRNA of interest. Additional issues arise once the RNA molecule enters the cell. One of the issues being the immune system. Our immune system can recognize RNA using the intracellular pathogen associated molecular pattern (PAMP) receptors and extracellular toll-like receptors (TLR). Activation of the receptors leads to a cytokine (IFNy-Interferon gamma) mediated immune response. Common applications to overcome the immune response include second generation chemical modifications. This process includes the introduction of small one at a time chemical modifications to avoid the immune response. However, there are some reports of adverse immune responses in clinical trials employing such modified reagents. There’s no fixed answer to issues with immunogenicity and ncRNA therapy. Modified adenovirus vectors have been used extensively in many clinical trials as a ncRNA delivery mechanism. In particular, adenovirus vector is considered an efficient delivery system due to its stability within live cells and non-pathogenicity. Even though viral transfections have achieved significant results in basic research, one of the issues is the non-specificity leading to off target transfections. Further research needs to be done to improve the accuracy of viral transfections for future tests and clinical trials.

== ASO Guidelines ==
In December 2021, the FDA came up with a draft guidance for the use of ASO drug products. This draft guidance was directed towards sponsor-investigators who are developing individualized investigational antisense oligonucleotides (ASO) drug products for severely debilitating or life threatening diseases. Severely debilitating corresponds to a disease or condition that causes major irreversible morbidity. However, life-threatening is defined as the disease or condition has a likelihood of death unless the course of treatment leads to an endpoint of survival. Usually individuals that have a severely debilitating life threatening disease don't have any alternative treatment options, and their diseases will be rapidly progressing, leading to an early death and/or devastating or irreversible morbidity within a short time frame without treatment.

Drug development is usually targeted for a large number of individuals, in this case that is not possible because of the specificity of the mechanism of action of the ASO combined with the rarity of the treatment-amenable patient population. Under FDA regulations, a protocol under which an individual ASO product is administered to a human subject must be reviewed and approved by an institutional review board (IRB) before it can be administered to human subjects. When the individual is a child, additional safeguards need to be identified in order to prevent any developmental issues from occurring that may affect the life of the individual. The sponsor-investigator needs to get informed consent from the individual or from the person who is responsible for the individual. The consent needs to include a description of reasonably foreseeable risks or discomforts as part of the use of the ASO drug. The sponsor also needs to get individuals clinical and genetic diagnosis to confirm that the ASO will be beneficial. The analysis may be through gene sequencing, enzymatic analysis, biochemical testing, imaging evaluations. All results need to be included in the application. Also the sponsor needs to include evidence that establishes the role of the gene variant targeted by the ASO drug. The sponsor/investigator need to also provide evidence that the identified gene variant or variants are unique to the individual.

The guidance suggests that the starting dose should be based on available non-clinical data that has been collected from model organisms or in vitro studies and should be in correlation with other ASO drug product dosing information that is available. At the starting dose, pharmacological effects are expected. Furthermore, It is advised that a dosing escalation method be utilized. This includes the step of escalating the dodge from its initial dose based on pharmacodynamic effects and/or trial participants' response to the ASO.

In addition, protocols submitted to the FDA need to have a clear dosing plan and justification for selecting the starting dose, dosing interval, and plan for dose escalation or dose reduction based on clinical pharmacodynamic effects of the drug on the individual. Also all anticipated outcomes should be included in the drug plan when submitted to the FDA. It is extremely important for the investigators to monitor the patient closely during dose escalation. During the escalation period, adequate time should be provided in order to see therapeutic results. It is advised that the investigator not make concurrent changes to the dosing interval along with the dose without justification. The submitted plan should include a de-escalation/discontinuation plan if toxicity is observed. All drug administration needs to take place in an inpatient setting just to get a grasp of the adverse effects the drug may have. Once drug toxicity, beneficiancy and adverse effects are identified, the drug can be administered in an outpatient manner as long as the same concentration of drug is administered.

== See also ==
- RNA therapeutics
- Messenger RNA
- RNA editing
