= Benzylidene acetal =

Functional group

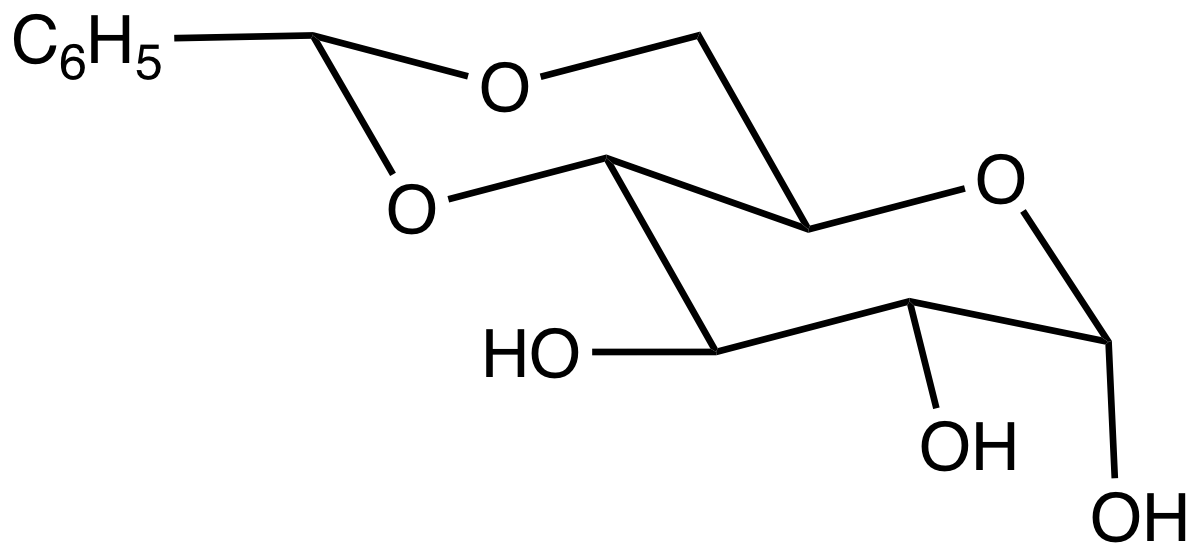
Structure of the benzylidene acetal of glucose.

In organic chemistry, a benzylidene acetal is the functional group with the structural formula C_{6}H_{5}CH(OR)_{2} (R = alkyl, aryl). Benzylidene acetals are used as protecting groups in glycochemistry. These compounds can also be oxidized to carboxylic acids in order to open important biological molecules, such as glycosaminoglycans, to other routes of synthesis. They arise from the reaction of a 1,2- or 1,3-diols with benzaldehyde. Other aromatic aldehydes are also used.
