= Chinese spinach =

Chinese spinach can mean any of several plants grown as leaf vegetables in China (among other places):

- Amaranthus dubius, (simplified Chinese: 苋菜; traditional Chinese: 莧菜; pinyin: xiàncài), often bearing red or purple marks
- Amaranthus tricolor
- Capsella bursa-pastoris, "shepherd's purse", (simplified Chinese: 荠菜; traditional Chinese: 薺菜; pinyin: jìcài)
- Ipomoea aquatica (water spinach; 蕹菜; wèngcài) semi-aquatic with hollow stems and long, lance-shaped leaves. Known as kangkong in South-East Asia, sold as "Ong Choy" or "On Choy" in West Coast North American Chinese markets.
- Malabar spinach, (落葵; luòkuí) with thick, succulent, heart-shaped leaves

== See also ==
- Spinach (disambiguation)
