= Spinach aptamer =

The need for fluorescently tracking RNA rose as its roles in complex cellular functions has grown to not only include mRNA, rRNA, and tRNA, but also RNAi, siRNA, snoRNA, and lncRNA, among others. Spinach is a synthetically derived RNA aptamer born out of the need for a way of studying the role of RNAs at the cellular level. This aptamer was created using Systematic Evolution for Ligands by EXponential enrichment, or SELEX, which is also known as in vitro evolution.

The SELEX method.

The aptamer was designed to be an RNA mimic of green fluorescent protein (GFP); similar to GFP for proteins, Spinach can be used for fluorescently labeling RNA and tracking it in vivo. A method for inserting the Spinach sequence after an RNA sequence of interest is readily available.

GFP’s fluorophore is made up of three cyclized amino acids within the beta-barrel structure: Serine65-Tyrosine66-Glycine67. This structure, 4-hydroxybenzylidene imidazolinone (HBI) was the basis for the synthetic analogue used in the SELEX studies. Many derivatives of this structure were screened using SELEX, but the chosen fluorophore, 3,5-difluoro-4-hydroxybenzylidene imidazolinone (DFHBI), showed the best selective fluorescence with high quantum yield (0.72) when bound to the RNA sequence 24-2, deemed Spinach.

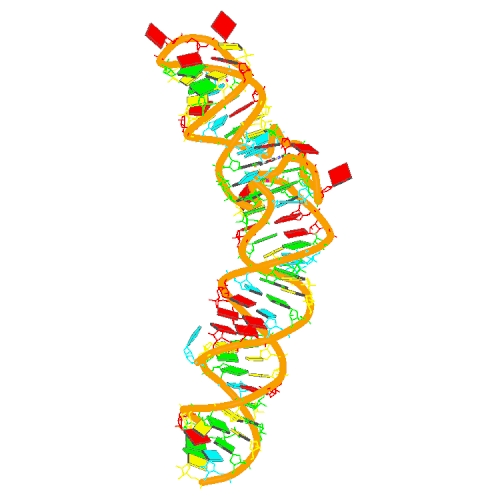
Crystal structure of Spinach PDB: 4KZD

It was determined that DFHBI only binds Spinach in the phenolate form. At pH < 6.0, both the phenolic and phenolate forms are detected. At pH = 6.0, only the phenolate peak is detected. DFHBI is also incredibly robust and resists photobleaching over a long period of time as compared to HBI and EGFP. It is believed that the free exchange of bound and unbound ligand allows for this persistence. As the fluorophore of GFP and its derivatives are covalently bound to/a part of the protein, free exchange cannot happen and thus photobleaching results.

Spinach is an 84-nucleotide-long structure with two helical strands and an internal bulge with a G-quadruplex motif. It is at this G-quadruplex that the fluorophore binds. Based on crystallographic data, massive rearrangement of the adjacent bases occurs once the fluorophore binds to accommodate the molecule. This binding is favorable, however, as it promotes base-stacking in a normally unstable region, i.e. the internal bulge. Similar to GFP, the DFHBI is also dehydrated, which would help with its high quantum yield.

Spinach has also been adapted for sensing proteins or molecules in vivo. An adapted structure, which includes two binding sites, limits fluorescence of the aptamer to (1) the fluorophore and (2) the protein or small molecule.
