= 3,5-Difluoro-4-hydroxybenzylidene imidazolinone =

Names
- Preferred IUPAC name (5Z)-5-[(3,5-Difluoro-4-hydroxyphenyl)methylidene]-2,3-dimethyl-3,5-dihydro-4H-imidazol-4-one
- Other names: DFHBI; 3,5-Difluoro-4-hydroxybenzylidene imidazolidinone; (Z)-4-(3,5-Difluoro-4-hydroxybenzylidene)-1,2-dimethyl-1H-imidazol-5(4H)-one

Identifiers
CAS Number	1241390-29-3
3D model (JSmol)	Interactive image
ChemSpider	35035087
PubChem CID	70808995
- InChI: InChI=1S/C12H10F2N2O2/c1-6-15-10(12(18)16(6)2)5-7-3-8(13)11(17)9(14)4-7/h3-5,17H,1-2H3/b10-5- Key: ZDDIJYXDUBFLID-YHYXMXQVSA-N
- SMILES: CC1=N/C(=C\C2=CC(=C(C(=C2)F)O)F)/C(=O)N1C

Properties
Chemical formula	C_{12}H_{10}F_{2}N_{2}O_{2}
Molar mass	252.221 g·mol^{−1}
- Except where otherwise noted, data are given for materials in their standard state (at 25 °C [77 °F], 100 kPa). Infobox references

3,5-Difluoro-4-hydroxybenzylidene imidazolinone or DFHBI is an imidazolinone fluorophore used in various biochemical studies. The benzene ring of DFHBI can freely rotate around the single bond but when it is fixed in planar conformation, DFHBI fluoresces. It is a synthetic analog of the GFP fluorophore.
