= Viral epitranscriptome =

Set of all modifications of viral transcripts

The viral epitranscriptome includes all modifications to viral transcripts, studied by viral epitranscriptomics. Like the more general epitranscriptome, these modifications do not affect the sequence of the transcript, but rather have consequences on subsequent structures and functions.

== History ==
The discovery of mRNA modifications dates back to 1957 with the discovery of the pseudouridine modification. Many of these modifications were found in the noncoding regions of cellular RNA. Once these modifications were discovered in mRNA, discoveries in viral transcripts soon followed. Detections have been aided with the advancement and use of new techniques such as m^{6}A seq.

== Mechanisms ==
=== Complexes ===
Viral RNA modifications use the same machinery as cellular RNA. This involves the use of "writer" and "reader" complexes. The writer complex contains the enzyme methyl transferase-like 3 (METTL3) and its cofactors like METTL14, WTP, KIAA1492 and RBM15/RBM15B which adds the m^{6}A modification in the nucleus. The family of proteins known as the YTH like YTHDC1 and YTHDC2 are capable of detecting these modifications within the nucleus. In the cytoplasm, the reading duties are carried out by YTHDF1, YTHDF2, and YTHDF3. The proteins ALKBH5 and FTO remove the m^{6}A modification, functionally serving as erasers, with the latter having a more restricted selectivity depending on the position of the modification.

=== N^{6}-Methyladenosine (m^{6}A) ===
This modification involves the addition of a methyl group (-CH3) group to the 6th nitrogen on the adenine base in an mRNA molecule. This was among the first mRNA modifications to be discovered in 1974. This modification is common in viral mRNA transcripts and is found in nearly 25% of them. The distribution of the modification not uniform with some transcripts containing more than 10. m^{6}A modifications are a dynamic process with many applications ranging from viral interactions with cellular machinery and structural adjustments to viral life cycle control. Studies have shown different regulatory patterns for different viruses depending on the context. For single stranded RNA viruses, the effects of the modifications appear to differ on the basis of the viral family. In the HIV-1 genome, the single stranded positive sense RNA contains m^{6}A modifications at multiple sites in both the untranslated and coding regions. The presence of this modifications in the viral transcript is enough to increase corresponding modifications in host cell mRNA through binding interactions between the HIV-1 gp 120 envelope protein, and the CD4 receptor in T lymphocytes without causing a corresponding increase in. For HIV-1 and other RNA viral families like chikungunya, enteroviruses and influenza, studies show both a positive and negative role for m^{6}A modifications on viral life replication and infection. For other families, the role effects are clearer. For the flaviridae family, the modification had a negative role and hindered viral replication. The modification in respiratory syncytial virus families showed a positive role and enhanced viral replication and infection. The causes of these apparently different roles from different responses within the same family of viruses and why the viral families like flaviridae conserve m^{6}A modifications when they negatively impact their cycles are currently unknown and under investigation.

Most of the RNA viruses carry out their cycles in the cytoplasm, away from the required machinery for writing and erasing m^{6}A modifications which are housed in the nucleus. For DNA viruses, that cycle in the nucleus with direct access to said machinery, no clear general positive or negative regulatory role can be attributed to m^{6}A modifications. In the simian virus and hepatitis B viruses, different m^{6}A reading complexes were shown to have different roles in regulation with some having a conserved positive role and others having a neutral or negative effect on replication.

=== O-methylation ===
This modification involves the addition of a methyl group to the 2' hydroxyl (-OH) group of the ribose sugar of RNA molecules. In contrast with the m^{6}A modification, it is the ribose sugar, a part of the backbone rather than the base that is altered. It is present in various kinds of cellular RNA, providing coding and structural support. 2-O-methylation of viral RNA is often accompanied by the addition of an inverted N-7methylguanosine to the 5' end on the phosphate group. These modifications regulate important functions of viral RNA such as metabolism and immune system interactions.

Different viruses have their mechanisms for acquiring this modification. Cytoplasmic RNA viruses like flaviridae and coronaviruses encode the required to catalyze cap formation reactions, with some needing one enzyme for the 5' cap and 2-O-methylation while others require two enzymes like poxviruses. Others, like influenza virus can hijack the methylguanosine caps from host cell mRNA and be preferentially translated.

=== 5-methylcytidine (m^{5}C) ===
One viral epitranscriptome modification that has been identified is the 5-methylcytidine (m^{5}C). HIV-1 and MLV transcriptomes contain elevated levels of these residues by approximately 14-30 fold when compared to a cell's normal levels. NSUN2 is the complex that codes the cytidine methyltransferases credited with m^{5}C formation in cells and amplification in viral epitranscriptomes. The NSUN2 affects the translational aspect of the mRNA in the viral cells, boosting the expression of the viral genome. It has also been found that the m^{5}C alters the splicing pattern and locations in the viral transcriptome. This affected the HIV-1 transcript in both early and late infection.

== Immune system ==
Viral RNA modifications play important roles in interactions with the immune system of host cells. The m^{6}A modification of viral RNAs allows for the viruses to escape recognition by the retinoic acid inducible gene-I receptor (RIG-I), in the type 1 IFN response, a crucial pathway of innate immunity. 5' N-7methylguanisone capping and 2-O-methylation also play vital roles for the viral infections. The cap structures help viral RNA to blend in among modified cellular mRNA and avoid triggering immune response systems.
