= Trud =

Trud, translated from Bulgarian, Russian and other Slavic languages as "Labour", may refer to:

- Trud (Bulgarian newspaper)
- Trud (Russian newspaper)
- Trud (sports society), the republican Voluntary Sports Society of the Russian SFSR
- Trud, Kemerovo Oblast, a village (selo) in Kemerovo Oblast, Russia
- Trud, Plovdiv Province, a village in Plovdiv Province, Bulgaria
- FC Trud Noginsk, former name of FC Znamya Noginsk
- FC Trud Tula, former name of FC Arsenal Tula
- FC Trud Voronezh, former name of FC Fakel Voronezh
- TRNA pseudouridine^{13} synthase (TruD), an enzyme
- Andrey Trud (1921-1999), Soviet World War II fighter pilot, Hero of the Soviet Union

== See also ==
- Thrud
- Trud Stadium (disambiguation)
