= Mir-605 microRNA precursor family =

mir-605

Identifiers
- Symbol: mir-605
- Rfam: RF01011
- miRBase family: MIPF0000528

Other data
- RNA type: microRNA
- Domain: Eukaryota;
- PDB structures: PDBe

In molecular biology mir-605 microRNA is a short RNA molecule. MicroRNAs function to regulate the expression levels of other genes by several mechanisms.

== p53 protein network ==
miR-605 is transcriptionally activated by the p53 protein through interaction with the promoter region of its gene. This microRNA in turn post-transcriptionally represses the oncoprotein and p53 suppressor Mdm2, which acts with p53 in a negative feedback loop in p53-wildtype cancers. Introduction of miR-605 interrupts this p53:Mdm2 interaction and instead there is a positive feedback loop in place, enabling rapid p53 accumulation in response to stress. Such p53 accumulation induces cell cycle arrest and apoptosis.

== See also ==
- MicroRNA
