= Small nucleolar RNA snR64 =

RNA molecule

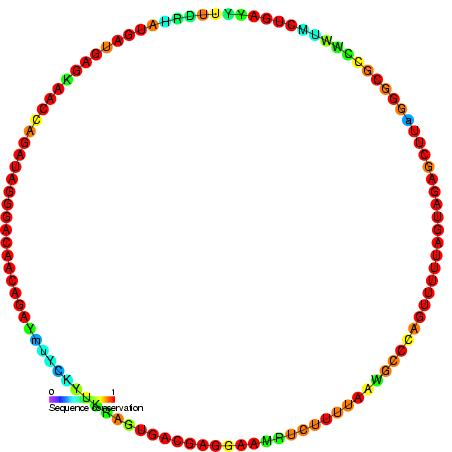
- Predicted secondary structure and sequence conservation of snosnR64

Identifiers
- Symbol: snosnR64
- Rfam: RF00509

Other data
- RNA type: Gene; snRNA; snoRNA; CD-box
- Domain: Eukaryota
- GO: GO:0006396 GO:0005730
- SO: SO:0000593
- PDB structures: PDBe

In molecular biology, snR64 is an RNA molecule belonging to the C/D class of small nucleolar RNA (snoRNA), which contain the C (UGAUGA) and D (CUGA) box motifs. Similar to most members of the box C/D family, snR64 is conjectured to help direct site-specific 2'-O-methylation of substrate RNAs.
