= YPFL =

YPFL may refer to:

- Yorke Peninsula Football League
- TRNAMet cytidine acetyltransferase, an enzyme
