= TMCA =

TMCA may refer to:

- Tauro-muricholic acid, a type of bile acid
- The Medical Center of Aurora, in Aurora, Colorado
- Total Museum of Contemporary Art, in Seoul, South Korea
- Toyota Motor Corporation Australia, a subsidiary of Toyota Motor Corporation
- TRNAMet cytidine acetyltransferase (TmcA), an enzyme
- Tsing Ma Control Area, a subdivision of Hong Kong
