= Wilms tumor protein =

Transcription factor gene involved in the urogenital system

WT1
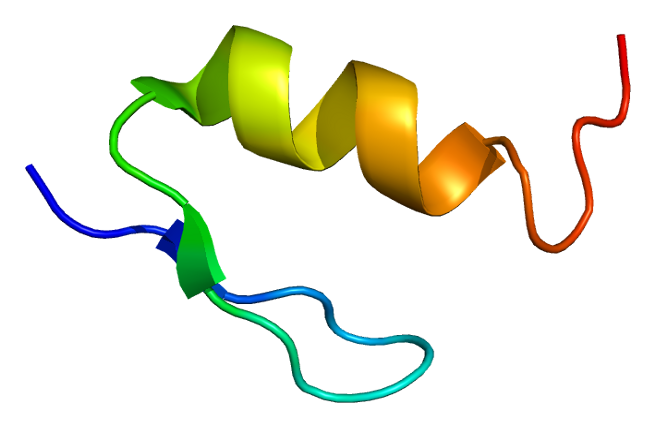

Identifiers
- Aliases: WT1, AEWS-GUD, NPHS4, WAGR, WIT-2, WT33, Wilms tumor 1, WT1 transcription factor, WT-1
- External IDs: OMIM: 607102; MGI: 98968; GeneCards: WT1
Available structures
PDB	Ortholog search: PDBe RCSB
PDB	List of PDB id codes 1XF7, 2JP9, 2JPA, 2PRT, 3HPJ, 3MYJ, 4R2E, 4R2P, 4R2Q, 4R2R, 4R2S, 4WUU

Gene location (Human)
Chr.	Chromosome 11 (human)
Band	11p13	Start	32,387,775 bp
Band	11p13	End	32,435,564 bp

Gene location (Mouse)
Chr.	Chromosome 2 (mouse)
Band	2 E3|2 55.06 cM	Start	104,956,874 bp
Band	2 E3|2 55.06 cM	End	105,003,961 bp
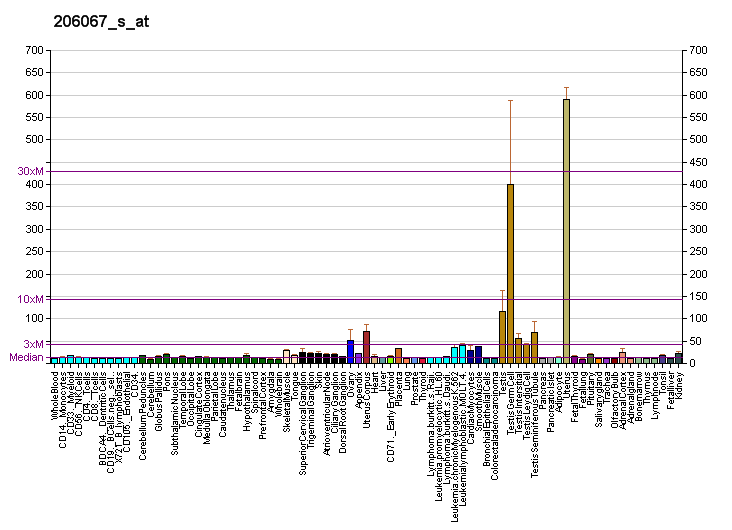

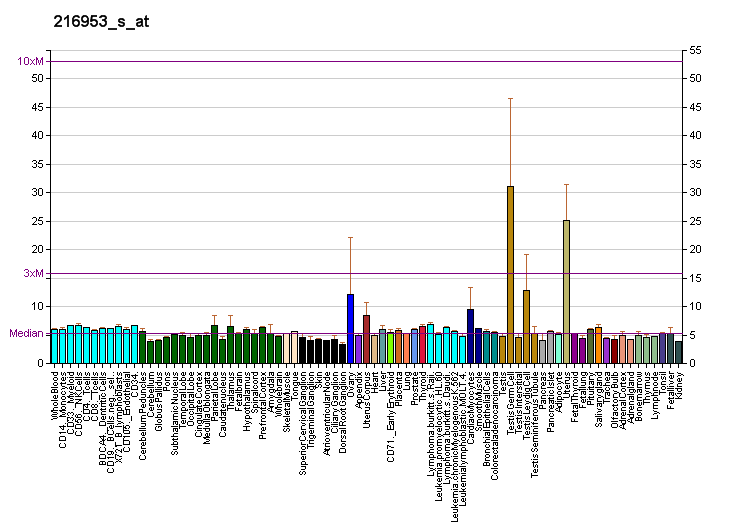
RNA expression pattern
Bgee	Human / Mouse (ortholog); Top expressed in: germinal epithelium; glomerulus; metanephric glomerulus; parietal pleura; right uterine tube; left uterine tube; body of uterus; decidua; myometrium; left ovary / Top expressed in: gastrula; decidua; Gonadal ridge; dorsal mesentery; germinal epithelium; adventitia of seminal vesicle; mesorchium; coelomic epithelium; vas deferens; muscle layer of seminal vesicle; More reference expression data
BioGPS	More reference expression data
Gene ontology
Molecular function	sequence-specific DNA binding; DNA binding; DNA-binding transcription factor activity; zinc ion binding; DNA-binding transcription activator activity, RNA polymerase II-specific; C2H2 zinc finger domain binding; metal ion binding; protein binding; RNA binding; nucleic acid binding; double-stranded methylated DNA binding; hemi-methylated DNA-binding; DNA-binding transcription factor activity, RNA polymerase II-specific
Cellular component	cytoplasm; nuclear speck; nucleoplasm; nucleolus; nucleus; cytosol
Biological process	germ cell development; adrenal cortex formation; ureteric bud development; negative regulation of translation; male gonad development; male genitalia development; regulation of transcription, DNA-templated; epithelial cell differentiation; glomerular basement membrane development; diaphragm development; kidney development; regulation of transcription by RNA polymerase II; posterior mesonephric tubule development; visceral serous pericardium development; metanephric epithelium development; negative regulation of apoptotic process; glomerulus development; negative regulation of transcription by RNA polymerase II; adrenal gland development; transcription, DNA-templated; positive regulation of metanephric ureteric bud development; vasculogenesis; positive regulation of transcription, DNA-templated; positive regulation of heart growth; development of the heart; negative regulation of female gonad development; branching involved in ureteric bud morphogenesis; regulation of animal organ formation; sex-determination system; negative regulation of cell growth; RNA splicing; cardiac muscle cell fate commitment; tissue development; positive regulation of apoptotic process; camera-type eye development; metanephric S-shaped body morphogenesis; thorax and anterior abdomen determination; negative regulation of transcription, DNA-templated; gonad development; metanephric mesenchyme development; cellular response to gonadotropin stimulus; positive regulation of male gonad development; cellular response to cAMP; negative regulation of cell population proliferation; mesenchymal to epithelial transition; negative regulation of metanephric glomerular mesangial cell proliferation; positive regulation of transcription by RNA polymerase II; transcription by RNA polymerase II; glomerular visceral epithelial cell differentiation; positive regulation of gene expression; positive regulation of pri-miRNA transcription by RNA polymerase II; positive regulation of DNA methylation
Sources:Amigo / QuickGO
Orthologs
Databases	NCBI: entry; OMA: entry
Species	Human	Mouse
Entrez	7490	22431
Ensembl	ENSG00000184937	ENSMUSG00000016458
UniProt	P19544	P22561; Q199A7
RefSeq (mRNA)	NM_024426; NM_000378; NM_001198551; NM_001198552; NM_024424 NM_024425; NM_001367854	NM_144783
RefSeq (protein)	NP_000369; NP_001185480; NP_001185481; NP_077742; NP_077744 NP_001354783; NP_000369.3; NP_001185480.1; NP_001185481.1; NP_077742.2; NP_077744.3	NP_659032
Location (UCSC)	Chr 11: 32.39 – 32.44 Mb	Chr 2: 104.96 – 105 Mb
PubMed search
- Wikidata
View/Edit Human	View/Edit Mouse

Wilms tumor protein (WT33) is a protein that in humans is encoded by the WT1 gene on band 13 of chromosome 11p.

== Function ==
This gene encodes a transcription factor that contains four zinc finger motifs at the C-terminus and a proline / glutamine-rich DNA-binding domain at the N-terminus. It has an essential role in the normal development of the urogenital system, and it is mutated in a subset of patients with Wilms' tumor, the gene's namesake. Multiple transcript variants, resulting from alternative splicing at two coding exons, have been well characterized. There is also evidence for the use of non-AUG (CUG) translation initiation site upstream of, and in-frame with the first AUG, leading to additional isoforms.

== Structure ==
WT1

Identifiers
- Symbol: WT1
- Pfam: PF02165
- InterPro: IPR000976
Available protein structures:
- PDB: IPR000976 PF02165 (ECOD; PDBsum)
- AlphaFold: IPR000976; PF02165

The WT1 gene product shows similarity to the zinc fingers of the mammalian growth regulated early growth response protein 1 (EGR1) and (EGR2) proteins.

== Clinical significance ==
Mutations of Wilms' tumor suppressor gene1 (WT1) are associated with embryonic malignancy of the kidney, affecting around 1-9 in 100,000 infants. It occurs in both sporadic and hereditary forms. Inactivation of WT1 causes Wilms tumour, and Denys-Drash syndrome (DDS), leading to nephropathy and genital abnormalities. The WT1 protein has been found to bind a host of cellular factors, e.g. p53, a known tumor suppressor. Despite the name, WT1 mutation is found in only about 5-10% of Wilms Tumor cases. Some other genes associated with Wilms' tumor predisposition are WT2 and H19 in the nearby region 15.5 of chromosome 11p, and CTNNB1, PAX6, BRCA2 and GPC3.

WT1 is mutated in a mutually exclusive manner with TET2, IDH1, and IDH2 in acute myeloid leukemia. TET2 can be recruited by WT1 to its target genes and activates WT1-target genes by converting 5mC into 5hmC residues at the genes' promoters, representing an important feature of a new regulatory WIT pathway linked to the development of AML.

The serine protease HtrA2 binds to WT1 and it cleaves WT1 at multiple sites following the treatment with cytotoxic drugs.

Using immunohistochemistry, WT1 protein can be demonstrated in the cell nuclei of 75% of mesotheliomas and in 93% of ovarian serous carcinomas, as well as in benign mesothelium and fallopian tube epithelium. This allows these tumours to be distinguished from other, similar, cancers, such as adenocarcinoma. Antibodies to the WT1 protein, however, also frequently cross-react with cytoplasmic proteins in a variety of benign and malignant cells, so that only nuclear staining can be considered diagnostic.

Mutation in WT1 causes predisposition to hernias.

=== As a drug target ===
A vaccine that induces an acquired immune response against WT1 is in clinical trials for various cancers. T cell therapies (TCR-T) are also being tested in clinical trials for leukemia.

=== Disease monitoring ===
WT1 gene is overexpressed in case of hematological malignancies. This fact is widely used for disease monitoring - evaluations of treatment success, as well as relapse or remission post-treatment checks. Preferably quantitative polymerase chain reaction (qPCR) is used to establish the levels of WT1 expression. The rising level of WT1 expression is significantly connected with disease progression and relapse of the proliferative disorder. WT1 as a marker is used as a "golden standard" for monitoring of acute myeloid leukemia, however other hematological malignancies such as chronic myeloid leukemia or myeloproliferative syndrome can manifest with overexpressed WT1 and for in specific cases WT1 monitoring can be used even in patients diagnosed with those types of cancer.

== Interactions ==
WT1 has been shown to interact with TET2, U2AF2, PAWR, UBE2I and WTAP. In combination with CITED2 activates WT1 the steroidogenic factor 1

== RNA editing ==
There is some evidence for RNA editing of human WT1 mRNA. As with alternative splicing of the gene RNA editing increases the number of isoforms of this protein.

Editing is tissue specific and developmentally regulated. Editing shown to be restricted in testis and kidney in the rat. Editing of this gene product has been found to occur in mice and rats as well as humans.

=== Editing type ===
The editing site is found at nucleotide position 839 found in exon 6 of the gene. It causes a codon change from a Proline codon (CCC) to a Leucine codon (CUC).

The type of editing is a uridine to cytidine (U to C) base change. The editing reaction is thought to be an amidation of uridine which converts it to a cytidine. The relevance of this editing is unknown as is the enzyme responsible for this editing. The region where editing occurs like that of other editing sites, e.g., ApoB mRNA editing is conserved. Mice, rats and humans have conserved sequences flanking the editing site consisting of 10 nucleotides before the editing site and four after the site.

=== Effects of editing ===
RNA editing results in an alternative amino acid being translated. The changes in amino acid occur in a region identified as a domain involved in transcription activation function.

Editing has been shown to decrease repressive regulation of transcription of growth promoting genes in vitro compared to the non edited protein. Although the physiological role of editing has yet to be determined, suggestions have been made that editing may play a role in the pathogenesis of Wilms tumour.

== Experimental models ==
WT1 gene can be found as well in the genome of mice. The mouse model with a WT1 knock-out shows symptoms corresponding to human pathophysiology. The mice were observed to have defects of urogenital tract similar to cases patients when WT1 signalling has been malfunctioning. The mouse had absent kidneys as their development failed during embryonic stages. This suggests that WT1 is unconditionally required for a proper kidney formation and development.

Apart from that, the WT1 knock-out mice lacked several types of glands, such as gonads or adrenal glands. The effect of the knock-out was as well visible on heart and blood circulation - several abnormalities concerning heart and diaphragm, as well as troubles with swelling and lymph circulation were described. Due to those defects, the mouse died before it was even born.

Mouse model is used to study some specific disorder connected with WT1 expression, too, such as acute myeloid leukemia. To examine the expression levels and localisation of WT1, a mouse model using WT1-GFP (green fluorescent protein) knock-in has been made. This model showed, that WT1 is significantly overexpressed in leukemic cells compared to none or minor expression in normal untransformed cells from bone marrow, either hematopoietic stem cells or hematopoietic progenitors and precursors.
