= N1-Methylguanosine =

Modified purine nucleoside

- Chemical structure of 1-methylguanosine

Names
- IUPAC name 2-amino-9-[(2R,3R,4S,5R)-3,4-dihydroxy-5-(hydroxymethyl)oxolan-2-yl]-1-methylpurin-6-one
- Other names: m1G; 1-Methylguanosine; 1-methyl-guanosine

Identifiers
CAS Number	2140-65-0
3D model (JSmol)	Interactive image
ChEBI	CHEBI:19062
ChemSpider	58642
ECHA InfoCard	100.159.022
KEGG	C02640
PubChem CID	65133
CompTox Dashboard (EPA)	DTXSID901316493
- InChI: InChI=1S/C11H15N5O5/c1-15-9(20)5-8(14-11(15)12)16(3-13-5)10-7(19)6(18)4(2-17)21-10/h3-4,6-7,10,17-19H,2H2,1H3,(H2,12,14)/t4-,6-,7-,10-/m1/s1 Key: UTAIYTHAJQNQDW-KQYNXXCUSA-N
- SMILES: CN1C(=O)C2=C(N=C1N)N(C=N2)[C@H]3[C@@H]([C@@H]([C@H](O3)CO)O)O

Properties
Chemical formula	C_{11}H_{15}N_{5}O_{5}
Molar mass	297.27 g/mol
Appearance	White crystalline solid
Solubility in water	Soluble in water
- Except where otherwise noted, data are given for materials in their standard state (at 25 °C [77 °F], 100 kPa). Infobox references

N1-Methylguanosine (also 1-methylguanosine or m^{1}G) is a modified nucleoside, derived from guanosine through the addition of a methyl group to the nitrogen atom at position 1 of the guanine base. This modification results in a fixed positive charge on the purine ring. It occurs in all transfer RNAs (tRNAs) that read codons starting with C except in those tRNAs that read CAN codons.

m^{1}G can help prevent errors in protein synthesis, and lower levels can cause significant errors, reduction of protein output, and lower cell viability. Additionally, as a RNA component, it is excreted in urine and elevated levels may be usable as an indicator of certain cancers.

== Occurrence and function ==
The most extensively studied function of m^{1}G is in tRNA, where it is typically found at position 37 (m^{1}G37), immediately 3' to the anticodon. This modification is critical for maintaining translational fidelity. The presence of m1G37, with its positive charge and steric bulk, helps prevent frameshift errors during protein synthesis, particularly at codons susceptible to +1 frame-shifting, by stabilizing the codon-anticodon interaction and ensuring correct alignment within the ribosome. Loss of m1G37 modification can lead to significant translational errors, global reduction of protein output, and reduced cell viability. In addition to its presence in position 37, m^{1}G is also found in position 9 of many cytosolic and mitochondrial tRNAs. The presence of m^{1}G in tRNA has also been identified as part of the epitranscriptome.

== Biosynthesis ==
The methylation of guanosine at the N-1 position is catalyzed by specific RNA methyltransferase enzymes using S-adenosyl methionine (SAM) as the methyl donor. In bacteria, the enzyme responsible for m^{1}G37 formation is TrmD (tRNA (guanine^{37}-N1)-methyltransferase). TrmD is essential for the viability of many bacteria, making it an attractive target for the development of new antibiotics. In archaea and eukaryotes, the orthologous enzyme is Trm5. Despite catalyzing the same reaction, Trm5 enzymes differ significantly in structure and mechanism from bacterial TrmD.

== Clinical significance ==
Modified nucleosides, generated from the catabolism of RNA, are excreted in urine. Altered levels of RNA turnover and modification often occur in disease states, particularly cancer. Consequently, urinary concentrations of various modified nucleosides, including m^{1}G, have been investigated as potential non-invasive biomarkers. Studies have reported elevated urinary m^{1}G levels, along with other modified nucleosides, in patients with various malignancies, including breast cancer, lung cancer, leukemia, ovarian cancer, and renal cell carcinoma, often correlating with tumor stage or progression.

== See also ==
- Guanosine
- 7-Methylguanosine (m7G)
- RNA modification
- Epitranscriptomics
- Transfer RNA
- Methyltransferase
- Nucleoside
