= WTAP (gene) =

Protein that in humans is encoded by the WTAP gene

Identifiers
- Aliases: WTAP, Mum2, Wilms tumor 1 associated protein, WT1 associated protein
- External IDs: OMIM: 605442; MGI: 1926395; HomoloGene: 68422; GeneCards: WTAP; OMA:WTAP - orthologs

Gene location (Human)
Chr.	Chromosome 6 (human)
Band	6q25.3	Start	159,725,585 bp
Band	6q25.3	End	159,756,319 bp

Gene location (Mouse)
Chr.	Chromosome 17 (mouse)
Band	17|17 A1	Start	13,185,683 bp
Band	17|17 A1	End	13,213,056 bp
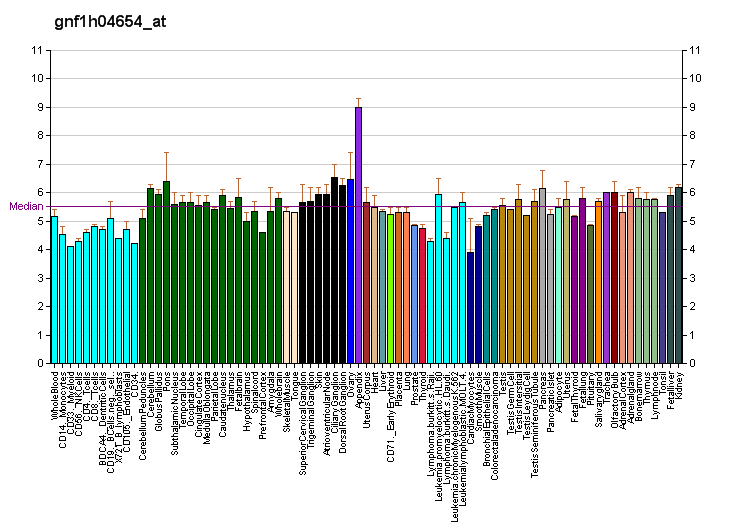

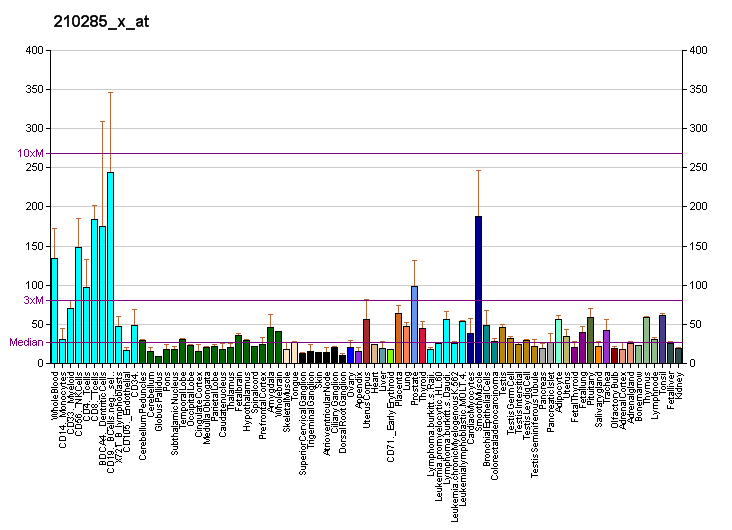

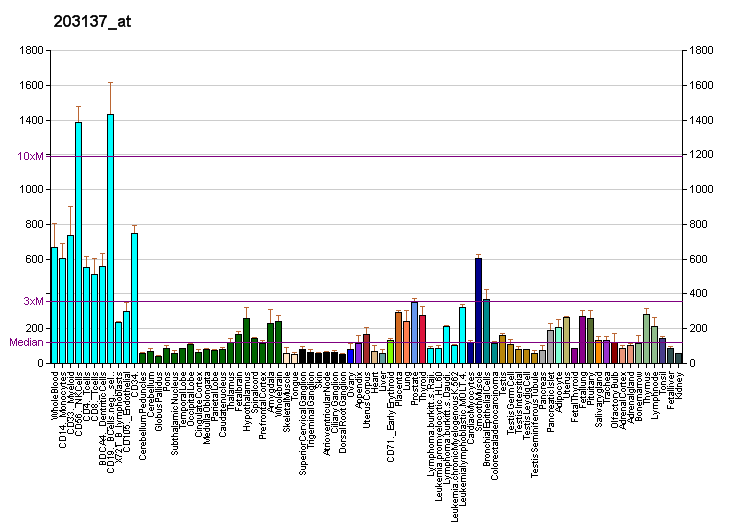
RNA expression pattern
Bgee	Human / Mouse (ortholog); Top expressed in: secondary oocyte; epithelium of nasopharynx; vena cava; buccal mucosa cell; cartilage tissue; amniotic fluid; germinal epithelium; pericardium; parietal pleura; caput epididymis / Top expressed in: morula; ciliary body; medullary collecting duct; vestibular membrane of cochlear duct; retinal pigment epithelium; endothelial cell of lymphatic vessel; condyle; primary oocyte; fossa; genital tubercle; More reference expression data
BioGPS	More reference expression data
Gene ontology
Molecular function	protein binding
Cellular component	nuclear membrane; nucleus; RNA N6-methyladenosine methyltransferase complex; nuclear speck; nucleoplasm; cytoplasm
Biological process	RNA splicing; cell cycle; mRNA processing; mRNA methylation; regulation of alternative mRNA splicing, via spliceosome; multicellular organism development; RNA metabolic process
Sources:Amigo / QuickGO
Orthologs
Species	Human	Mouse
Entrez	9589	60532
Ensembl	ENSG00000146457	ENSMUSG00000060475
UniProt	Q15007	Q9ER69
RefSeq (mRNA)	NM_001270531; NM_001270532; NM_001270533; NM_004906; NM_152857 NM_152858	NM_001113532; NM_001113533; NM_175394; NM_001379058
RefSeq (protein)	NP_001257460; NP_001257461; NP_001257462; NP_004897; NP_690596 NP_690597	NP_001107004; NP_001107005; NP_780603; NP_001365987
Location (UCSC)	Chr 6: 159.73 – 159.76 Mb	Chr 17: 13.19 – 13.21 Mb
PubMed search
- Wikidata
View/Edit Human	View/Edit Mouse

Pre-mRNA-splicing regulator WTAP is a protein that in humans is encoded by the WTAP gene.

The Wilms tumor suppressor gene WT1 appears to play a role in both transcriptional and posttranscriptional regulation of certain cellular genes. This gene encodes a WT1-associating protein, which is a ubiquitously expressed nuclear protein. Like WT1 protein, this protein is localized throughout the nucleoplasm as well as in speckles and partially colocalizes with splicing factors. Alternative splicing of this gene results in three transcript variants, two of which encode the same isoform.

== Interactions ==
WTAP has been shown to interact with WT1.
