= RNA Modification Base =

Post-transcriptional RNA modification database

RMBase

Content
- Description: RNA modifications identified from high-throughput sequencing datasets.

Contact
- Research center: Sun Yat-sen University
- Laboratory: Key Laboratory of Gene Engineering of the Ministry of Education
- Authors: Jian-Hua Yang
- Primary citation: Sun & al. (2015)
- Release date: 2010

Access
- Website: http://rna.sysu.edu.cn/rmbase/

RNA Modification Base (RMBase) is a database of RNA modifications identified from high-throughput sequencing. It contains numerous examples of modifications such as N6-methyladenosine, pseudouridine, 5-methylcytosine, 2′-O-methylation and ~3130 other types of RNA modification. RMBase includes thousands of modifications to messenger RNA, non-coding RNA and microRNA, and also includes information on disease-related SNPs.

== See also ==
- Nucleic acid modification databases
- RNA editing
