= 2'-O-methylation =

Biological molecule

2'-O-methyl-adenosine, a modified adenosine.

2'-O-methylation (2'-O-Me) is a nucleotide epitranscriptomics modification commonly found in ribosomal RNA (rRNA), transfer RNA (tRNA), and small nuclear RNA (snRNA).

This modification is created through post-transcriptional modification of the RNA. This modification can be performed via ribonucleoprotein (snoRNP) with C/D box small nucleolar RNA (snoRNA) used as a guide RNA where a methyl group is added to the 2' hydroxyl of the ribose moiety of any nucleotide (Nm) producing a methoxy group. It can also be performed through other enzymes without a guide RNA such as FTSJ1 in tRNAs. The modification of one Nm creates more stabilization in the structure by 0.2kcal/mol which is more enthalpically favorable. Currently, about 55 2'-O-methylations have been identified in yeast alone and 106 in humans and deposited in RNA Modification Base (RMBase) database. This modification changes the stability of RNA and is generaly associated to stabilization fo the structure of RNA while preventing it from undergoing hydrolysis as the hydroxyl group is replaced, and also to process of phosphorilation. A technique was developed based on this property called RiboMethSeq to quantify the amount of modifications existing in a sample of rRNA. RNA is a short lived molecule and each of the types vary in its longevity in the cell. Ribosomal RNA exists longer in the cell before degradation so utilizing 2'-O-Met would aid in stabilizing its structure. The epitranscriptomics of this particular RNA modification occurs post-translation, causing a change in the resulting protein without the DNA being altered.

Having chemical properties intermediate between RNA and DNA, 2'-O-methylation is presumed to have been one of the reactive group of RNA molecules on early Earth that would have given rise to DNA.

== See also ==
- Nucleic acid analogue
- Small nucleolar RNA
