= Trud Stadium =

Trud Stadium (the term Trud was the Trud Sports Society of the Soviet Union) may refer to any of several stadiums in Russia:

- Trud Stadium (Arkhangelsk)
- Trud Stadium (Balakovo)
- Trud Stadium (Irkutsk)
- Trud Stadium (Krasnodar)
- Trud Stadium (Podolsk)
- Trud Stadium (Tomsk)
- Trud Stadium (Ufa)
- Trud Stadium (Ulyanovsk)
