= Multisite-specific tRNA:(cytosine-C5)-methyltransferase =

Identifiers
- EC no.: 2.1.1.202

Databases
- IntEnz: IntEnz view
- BRENDA: BRENDA entry
- ExPASy: NiceZyme view
- KEGG: KEGG entry
- MetaCyc: metabolic pathway
- PRIAM: profile
- PDB structures: RCSB PDB PDBe PDBsum
Search
- PMC: articles
- PubMed: articles
- NCBI: proteins

Multisite-specific tRNA:(cytosine-C5)-methyltransferase (EC 2.1.1.202, multisite-specific tRNA:m5C-methyltransferase, TRM4 (gene)) is an enzyme with systematic name S-adenosyl-L-methionine:tRNA (cytosine-C5)-methyltransferase. This enzyme catalyses the following chemical reaction

(1) S-adenosyl-L-methionine + cytosine^{34} in tRNA precursor $\rightleftharpoons$ S-adenosyl-L-homocysteine + 5-methylcytosine^{34} in tRNA precursor
(2) S-adenosyl-L-methionine + cytosine^{40} in tRNA precursor $\rightleftharpoons$ S-adenosyl-L-homocysteine + 5-methylcytosine^{40} in tRNA precursor
(3) S-adenosyl-L-methionine + cytosine^{48} in tRNA $\rightleftharpoons$ S-adenosyl-L-homocysteine + 5-methylcytosine^{48} in tRNA
(4) S-adenosyl-L-methionine + cytosine^{49} in tRNA $\rightleftharpoons$ S-adenosyl-L-homocysteine + 5-methylcytosine^{49} in tRNA

The enzyme from Saccharomyces cerevisiae is responsible for complete 5-methylcytosine methylations of yeast tRNA.
