= Post-transcriptional regulation =

Control of gene expression at the RNA level, between transcription and translation

Post-transcriptional regulation is the control of gene expression at the RNA level. It occurs once the RNA polymerase has been attached to the gene's promoter and is synthesising the RNA sequence. Post-transcriptional processes consist of 5′ capping, RNA splicing, polyadenylation, subcellular localization and controlled degradation of RNA such as that mediated by the AU-rich element in eukaryotic cells. Some of these processes including 5′ capping, splicing and polyadenylation are coupled with transcription and occur while transcription is still happening.Post-transcriptional regulation significantly affects transcript level, function, structure and expression of final proteins.

Importance

Post-transcriptional regulation is critical for the gene expression regulation of many genes across human tissues. It also plays a big role in cell physiology, being implicated in pathologies such as cancer and neurodegenerative diseases. Post Transcriptional regulation is essential for the spatiotemporal control of gene expression in neurons.

Post-transcriptional regulation significantly enhance the developmental plasticity in eukaryotes as it incorporates endogenous and exogenous signals in gene expression. In recent studies it is reported that plant use post-transcriptional regulation to sense temperature signalling and other environmental stressors that help them to adapt in changing environmental conditions.

== Mechanism ==
The mechanism of post-transcriptional regulation consists of a series of conserved processing steps in the nucleus that produce mature RNA that can be translated into proteins in cytoplasm. Nuclear processing of nascent RNA consists of capping (adds 7-methylguanosine cap on 5′ end of RNA), splicing (removes introns) and polyadenylation (adds poly A tail on 3′ end of RNA).

The most extensively studied mechanism for post-transcriptional regulation is alternative splicing. However, other mechanisms include Short non-coding RNA molecules, such as small interfering RNA (siRNAs) or microRNAs (miRNAs). After being produced, the stability and distribution of the different transcripts is regulated (post-transcriptional regulation) by means of RNA-binding proteins (RBP) that control the various steps and rates controlling events such as alternative splicing, nuclear degradation (exosome), processing, nuclear export (three alternative pathways), sequestration in P-bodies for storage or degradation and ultimately translation. These proteins achieve these events thanks to an RNA recognition motif that binds a specific sequence or secondary structure of the transcripts, typically at the 5' and 3' UTR of the transcript. In short, the dsRNA sequences, which will be broken down into siRNA inside of the organism, will match up with the RNA to inhibit the gene expression in the cell.

Modulating the capping, splicing, addition of a Poly(A) tail, the sequence-specific nuclear export rates and in several contexts sequestration of the RNA transcript occurs in eukaryotes but not in prokaryotes. This modulation is a result of a protein or transcript which in turn is regulated and may have an affinity for certain sequences.

- Capping changes the five prime end of the mRNA to a three prime end by 5'-5' linkage, which protects the mRNA from 5' exonuclease, which degrades foreign RNA. The cap also helps in ribosomal binding. In addition, it represents a unique mark for a correct gene. Therefore, it helps to select the mRNA that is going to be translated.
- RNA splicing removes the introns, noncoding regions that are transcribed into RNA, in order to make the mRNA able to create proteins. Cells do this by spliceosomes binding on either side of an intron, looping the intron into a circle and then cleaving it off. The two ends of the exons are then joined.
- Addition of poly(A) tail otherwise known as polyadenylation. That is, a stretch of RNA that is made solely of adenine bases is added to the 3' end, and acts as a buffer to the 3' exonuclease in order to increase the half-life of mRNA. In addition, a long poly(A) tail can increase translation. Poly(A)-binding protein (PABP) binds to a long poly(A) tail and mediates the interaction between EIF4E and EIF4G which encourages the initiation of translation.
- RNA editing is a process which results in sequence variation in the RNA molecule, and is catalyzed by enzymes. These enzymes include the adenosine deaminase acting on RNA (ADAR) enzymes, which convert specific adenosine residues to inosine in an mRNA molecule by hydrolytic deamination. Three ADAR enzymes have been cloned, ADAR1, ADAR2 and ADAR3, although only the first two subtypes have been shown to have RNA editing activity. Many mRNAs are vulnerable to the effects of RNA editing, including the glutamate receptor subunits GluR2, GluR3, GluR4, GluR5 and GluR6 (which are components of the AMPA and kainate receptors), the serotonin2C receptor, the GABA-alpha3 receptor subunit, the tryptophan hydroxylase enzyme TPH2, the hepatitis delta virus and more than 16% of microRNAs. In addition to ADAR enzymes, CDAR enzymes exist and these convert cytosines in specific RNA molecules, to uracil. These enzymes are termed 'APOBEC' and have genetic loci at 22q13, a region close to the chromosomal deletion which occurs in velocardiofacial syndrome (22q11) and which is linked to psychosis. RNA editing is extensively studied in relation to infectious diseases, because the editing process alters viral function.
- mRNA Stability can be manipulated in order to control its half-life, and the poly(A) tail has some effect on this stability, as previously stated. Stable mRNA can have a half-life of up to a day or more which allows for the production of more protein product; unstable mRNA is used in regulation that must occur quickly. mRNA stability is an important factor that is based on mRNA degradation rates. AU-rich elements (AREs) are found in 3'UTR of mRNAs and can control mRNA translation and stability.
- Nuclear export. Only one-twentieth of the total amount of RNA leaves the nucleus to proceed with translation. The rest of the RNA molecules, usually excised introns and damaged RNAs, are kept in the nucleus where they are eventually degraded. mRNA only leaves the nucleus when processing is complete. There are some mechanisms that attack the nuclear export process to regulate gene expression. An example of regulated nuclear transport of mRNA can be observed in HIV.

== Transcription attenuation ==
Transcription attenuation is a type of prokaryotic regulation that happens only under certain conditions. This process occurs at the beginning of RNA transcription and causes the RNA chain to terminate before gene expression. Transcription attenuation is caused by the incorrect formation of a nascent RNA chain. This nascent RNA chain adopts an alternative secondary structure that does not interact appropriately with the RNA polymerase. In order for gene expression to proceed, regulatory proteins must bind to the RNA chain and remove the attenuation, which is costly for the cell.

In prokaryotes there are two mechanisms of transcription attenuation. These two mechanisms are intrinsic termination and factor-dependent termination.

- In the intrinsic termination mechanism, also known as Rho-independent termination, the RNA chain forms a stable transcript hairpin structure at the 3'end of the genes that cause the RNA polymerase to stop transcribing. The stem-loop is followed by a run of U's (poly U tail) which stalls the polymerase, so the RNA hairpin have enough time to form. Then, the polymerase is dissociated due to the weak binding between the poly U tail, from the transcript RNA, and the poly A tail, from the DNA template, causing the mRNA to be prematurely released. This process inhibits transcription. To clarify, this mechanism is called Rho-independent because it does not require any additional protein factor as the factor-dependent termination does, which is a simpler mechanism for the cell to regulate gene transcription. Some examples of bacteria where this type of regulation predominates are Neisseria, Psychrobacter and Pasteurellaceae, as well as the majority of bacteria in the Firmicutes phylum.

- In factor-dependent termination, which is a protein factor complex containing Rho factor, is bound to a segment from the RNA chain transcript. The Rho complex then starts looking in the 3' direction for a paused RNA polymerase. If the polymerase is found, the process immediately stops, which results in the abortion of RNA transcription. Even though this system is not as common as the one described above, there are some bacteria that uses this type of termination, such as the tna operon in E.coli.

This type of regulation is not efficient in eukaryotes because transcription occurs in the nucleus while translation occurs in the cytoplasm. Therefore, the mechanism is not continued and it cannot execute appropriately as it would if both processes happen on the cytoplasm.

== MicroRNA mediated regulation ==
MicroRNAs (miRNAs) appear to regulate the expression of more than 60% of protein coding genes of the human genome. If an miRNA is abundant it can behave as a "switch", turning some genes on or off. However, altered expression of many miRNAs only leads to a modest 1.5- to 4-fold change in protein expression of their target genes. Individual miRNAs often repress several hundred target genes. Repression usually occurs either through translational silencing of the mRNA or through degradation of the mRNA, via complementary binding, mostly to specific sequences in the 3' untranslated region of the target gene's mRNA. The mechanism of translational silencing or degradation of mRNA is implemented through the RNA-induced silencing complex (RISC).

== Feedback in the regulation of RNA binding proteins ==
RNA-Binding Proteins (RBPs) are dynamic assemblages between mRNAs and different proteins that form messenger ribonucleoprotein complexes (mRNPs). These complexes are essential for the regulation of gene expression to ensure that all the steps are performed correctly throughout the whole process. Therefore, they are important control factors for protein levels and cell phenotypes. Moreover, they affect mRNA stability by regulating its conformation due to the environment, stress or extracellular signals. However, their ability to bind and control such a wide variety of RNA targets allows them to form complex regulatory networks (PTRNs).These networks represent a challenge to study each RNA-binding protein individually. Thankfully, due to new methodological advances, the identification of RBPs is slowly expanding, which demonstrates that they are contained in broad families of proteins. RBPs can significantly impact multiple biological processes, and have to be very accurately expressed. Overexpression can change the mRNA target rate, binding to low-affinity RNA sites and causing deleterious results on cellular fitness. Not being able to synthesize at the right level is also problematic because it can lead to cell death. Therefore, RBPs are regulated via auto-regulation, so they are in control of their own actions. Furthermore, they use both negative feedback, to maintain homeostasis, and positive feedback, to create binary genetic changes in the cell.

In metazoans and bacteria, many genes involved in post-post transcriptional regulation are regulated post transcriptionally. For Drosophila RBPs associated with splicing or nonsense mediated decay, analyses of protein-protein and protein-RNA interaction profiles have revealed ubiquitous interactions with RNA and protein products of the same gene. It remains unclear whether these observations are driven by ribosome proximal or ribosome mediated contacts, or if some protein complexes, particularly RNPs, undergo co-translational assembly.

== Significance ==
A prokaryotic example: Salmonella enterica (a pathogenic γ-proteobacterium) can express two alternative porins depending on the external environment (gut or murky water), this system involves EnvZ (osomotic sensor) which activates OmpR (transcription factor) which can bind to a high affinity promoter even at low concentrations and the low affinity promoter only at high concentrations (by definition): when the concentration of this transcription factor is high it activates OmpC and micF and inhibits OmpF, OmpF is further inhibited post-transcriptionally by micF RNA which binds to the OmpF transcript

This area of study has recently gained more importance due to the increasing evidence that post-transcriptional regulation plays a larger role than previously expected. Even though protein with DNA binding domains are more abundant than protein with RNA binding domains, a recent study by Cheadle et al. (2005) showed that during T-cell activation 55% of significant changes at the steady-state level had no corresponding changes at the transcriptional level, meaning they were a result of stability regulation alone.

Furthermore, RNA found in the nucleus is more complex than that found in the cytoplasm: more than 95% (bases) of the RNA synthesized by RNA polymerase II never reaches the cytoplasm. The main reason for this is due to the removal of introns which account for 80% of the total bases. Some studies have shown that even after processing the levels of mRNA between the cytoplasm and the nucleus differ greatly.

Developmental biology is a good source of models of regulation, but due to the technical difficulties it was easier to determine the transcription factor cascades than regulation at the RNA level. In fact several key genes such as nanos are known to bind RNA but often their targets are unknown. Although RNA binding proteins may regulate post transcriptionally large amount of the transcriptome, the targeting of a single gene is of interest to the scientific community for medical reasons, this is RNA interference and microRNAs which are both examples of posttranscriptional regulation, which regulate the destruction of RNA and change the chromatin structure. To study post-transcriptional regulation several techniques are used, such as RIP-Chip (RNA immunoprecipitation on chip).

== microRNA role in cancer ==
Deficiency of expression of a DNA repair gene occurs in many cancers (see DNA repair defect and cancer risk and microRNA and DNA repair). Altered microRNA (miRNA) expression that either decreases accurate DNA repair or increases inaccurate microhomology-mediated end joining (MMEJ) DNA repair is often observed in cancers. Deficiency of accurate DNA repair may be a major source of the high frequency of mutations in cancer (see mutation frequencies in cancers). Repression of DNA repair genes in cancers by changes in the levels of microRNAs may be a more frequent cause of repression than mutation or epigenetic methylation of DNA repair genes.

For instance, BRCA1 is employed in the accurate homologous recombinational repair (HR) pathway. Deficiency of BRCA1 can cause breast cancer. Down-regulation of BRCA1 due to mutation occurs in about 3% of breast cancers. Down-regulation of BRCA1 due to methylation of its promoter occurs in about 14% of breast cancers. However, increased expression of miR-182 down-regulates BRCA1 mRNA and protein expression, and increased miR-182 is found in 80% of breast cancers.

In another example, a mutated constitutively (persistently) expressed version of the oncogene c-Myc is found in many cancers. Among many functions, c-Myc negatively regulates microRNAs miR-150 and miR-22. These microRNAs normally repress expression of two genes essential for MMEJ, Lig3 and Parp1, thereby inhibiting this inaccurate, mutagenic DNA repair pathway. Muvarak et al. showed, in leukemias, that constitutive expression of c-Myc, leading to down-regulation of miR-150 and miR-22, allowed increased expression of Lig3 and Parp1. This generates genomic instability through increased inaccurate MMEJ DNA repair, and likely contributes to progression to leukemia.

To show the frequent ability of microRNAs to alter DNA repair expression, Hatano et al. performed a large screening study, in which 810 microRNAs were transfected into cells that were then subjected to ionizing radiation (IR). For 324 of these microRNAs, DNA repair was reduced (cells were killed more efficiently by IR) after transfection. For a further 75 microRNAs, DNA repair was increased, with less cell death after IR. This indicates that alterations in microRNAs may often down-regulate DNA repair, a likely important early step in progression to cancer.

== See also ==
- Cis-regulatory element
- Glossary of gene expression terms
- RNA interference
