= TRNA pseudouridine13 synthase =

tRNA pseudouridine^{13} synthase

Identifiers
- EC no.: 5.4.99.27
- CAS no.: 430429-15-5

Databases
- IntEnz: IntEnz view
- BRENDA: BRENDA entry
- ExPASy: NiceZyme view
- KEGG: KEGG entry
- MetaCyc: metabolic pathway
- PRIAM: profile
- PDB structures: RCSB PDB PDBe PDBsum
Search
- PMC: articles
- PubMed: articles
- NCBI: proteins

tRNA pseudouridine^{13} synthase (EC 5.4.99.27, TruD, YgbO, tRNA PSI13 synthase, RNA:PSI-synthase Pus7p, Pus7p, RNA:pseudouridine-synthase Pus7p, Pus7 protein) is an enzyme with systematic name tRNA-uridine^{13} uracil mutase. This enzyme catalyses the following chemical reaction

tRNA uridine^{13} $\rightleftharpoons$ tRNA pseudouridine^{13}

Pseudouridine synthase TruD from Escherichia coli specifically acts on uridine^{13} in tRNA.
