= YTHDC1 =

Protein-coding gene in humans

Identifiers
- Aliases: YTHDC1, YT521, YT521-B, YTH domain containing 1
- External IDs: OMIM: 617283; MGI: 2443713; GeneCards: YTHDC1
Available structures
PDB	Ortholog search: PDBe RCSB
PDB	List of PDB id codes 2YUD, 4R3H, 4R3I

Gene location (Human)
Chr.	Chromosome 4 (human)
Band	4q13.2	Start	68,310,387 bp
Band	4q13.2	End	68,350,090 bp

Gene location (Mouse)
Chr.	Chromosome 5 (mouse)
Band	5|5 E1	Start	86,952,080 bp
Band	5|5 E1	End	86,984,518 bp
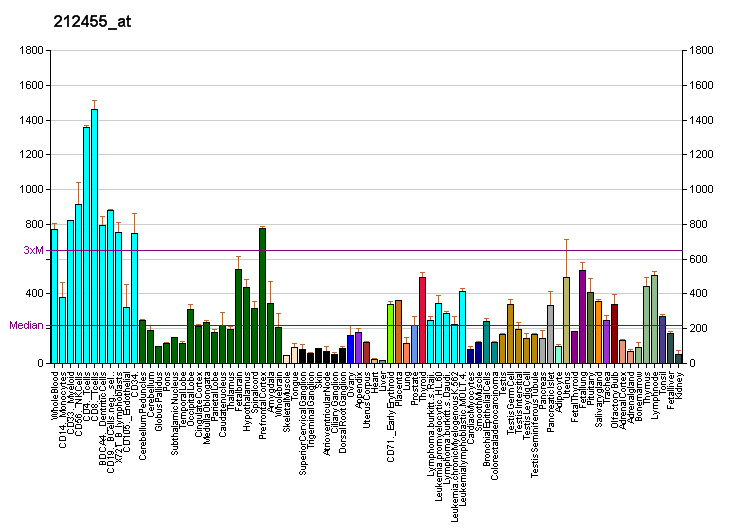
RNA expression pattern
Bgee	Human / Mouse (ortholog); Top expressed in: Achilles tendon; corpus callosum; sural nerve; left ovary; bone marrow; endometrium; ventricular zone; right ovary; right lung; vagina / Top expressed in: medullary collecting duct; conjunctival fornix; renal corpuscle; cumulus cell; ureter; ciliary body; pineal gland; vestibular membrane of cochlear duct; Rostral migratory stream; Paneth cell; More reference expression data
BioGPS	More reference expression data
Gene ontology
Molecular function	protein binding; RNA binding; N6-methyladenosine-containing RNA binding
Cellular component	nucleus; nuclear speck; plasma membrane; nucleoplasm
Biological process	mRNA processing; mRNA splice site selection; RNA splicing; regulation of mRNA splicing, via spliceosome; mRNA export from nucleus; dosage compensation by inactivation of X chromosome; posttranscriptional regulation of gene expression
Sources:Amigo / QuickGO
Orthologs
Databases	NCBI: entry; OMA: entry
Species	Human	Mouse
Entrez	91746	231386
Ensembl	ENSG00000275272; ENSG00000083896	ENSMUSG00000035851
UniProt	Q96MU7	E9Q5K9
RefSeq (mRNA)	NM_001031732; NM_133370; NM_001330698	NM_177680; NM_001347375; NM_001347376; NM_001359907; NM_001359908
RefSeq (protein)	NP_001026902; NP_001317627; NP_588611	NP_001334304; NP_001334305; NP_808348; NP_001346836; NP_001346837
Location (UCSC)	Chr 4: 68.31 – 68.35 Mb	Chr 5: 86.95 – 86.98 Mb
PubMed search
- Wikidata
View/Edit Human	View/Edit Mouse

YTH domain-containing protein 1 is a protein that in humans is encoded by the YTHDC1 gene. YTHDC1 is a nuclear protein involved in splice site selection that localises to YT bodies; dynamic subnuclear compartments, which first appear at the beginning of S-phase in the cell cycle and disperse during mitosis.

== Interactions ==
YTHDC1 has been shown to interact with:

- Abl gene,
- C-src tyrosine kinase,
- Emerin,
- KHDRBS1. and
- Metadherin

== Role in disease ==
Alternative splicing is altered in a number of diseases and is particularly relevant to cancer.

=== Cancer ===
YTHDC1 has been shown to splice mRNA transcripts which have oncological importance, regulating tumour functions such as hypoxia associated vascular endothelial growth factor (VEGF), DNA damage associated breast cancer 1 (BRCA1) and hormonal growth driver; the progesterone receptor (PGR).

In prostate cancer, YTHDC1 has also been shown to interact with the protein metadherin, encoded by the oncogene MTDH acting to influence alternative splicing of tumour-related genes such as CD44.

== See also ==
N^{6}-Methyladenosine
