= METTL14 =

Protein-coding gene in the species Homo sapiens

Identifiers
- Aliases: METTL14, methyltransferase like 14, hmethyltransferase 14, N6-adenosine-methyltransferase subunit
- External IDs: OMIM: 616504; MGI: 2442926; GeneCards: METTL14
Available structures
PDB	Ortholog search: PDBe RCSB
PDB	List of PDB id codes 5IL1, 5K7W, 5IL2, 5IL0, 5K7M, 5K7U

Gene location (Human)
Chr.	Chromosome 4 (human)
Band	4q26	Start	118,685,392 bp
Band	4q26	End	118,715,433 bp

Gene location (Mouse)
Chr.	Chromosome 3 (mouse)
Band	3|3 G1	Start	123,161,946 bp
Band	3|3 G1	End	123,179,757 bp
RNA expression pattern
Bgee	Human / Mouse (ortholog); Top expressed in: Achilles tendon; secondary oocyte; tail of epididymis; islet of Langerhans; caput epididymis; corpus epididymis; ventricular zone; epithelium of colon; thymus; pancreatic epithelial cell / Top expressed in: hand; ascending aorta; aortic valve; otolith organ; utricle; primitive streak; tail of embryo; efferent ductule; epiblast; supraoptic nucleus; More reference expression data
BioGPS	n/a
Gene ontology
Molecular function	RNA binding; mRNA binding; S-adenosyl-L-methionine binding; protein binding; mRNA (2'-O-methyladenosine-N6-)-methyltransferase activity
Cellular component	RNA N6-methyladenosine methyltransferase complex; nucleus; nucleoplasm
Biological process	stem cell population maintenance; mRNA splicing, via spliceosome; mRNA destabilization; mRNA methylation; RNA methylation; mRNA catabolic process; spermatogenesis; forebrain radial glial cell differentiation; gliogenesis; cell differentiation; RNA metabolic process
Sources:Amigo / QuickGO
Orthologs
Databases	NCBI: entry; OMA: entry
Species	Human	Mouse
Entrez	57721	210529
Ensembl	ENSG00000145388	ENSMUSG00000028114
UniProt	Q9HCE5	Q3UIK4
RefSeq (mRNA)	NM_020961	NM_201638
RefSeq (protein)	NP_066012	NP_964000
Location (UCSC)	Chr 4: 118.69 – 118.72 Mb	Chr 3: 123.16 – 123.18 Mb
PubMed search
- Wikidata
View/Edit Human	View/Edit Mouse

Methyltransferase like 14 is a protein that in humans is encoded by the METTL14 gene.
