= RBM15 =

Protein-coding gene in humans

Identifiers
- Aliases: RBM15, OTT, OTT1, SPEN, RNA binding motif protein 15, Putative RNA-binding protein 15
- External IDs: OMIM: 606077; MGI: 2443205; GeneCards: RBM15

Gene location (Human)
Chr.	Chromosome 1 (human)
Band	1p13.3	Start	110,338,506 bp
Band	1p13.3	End	110,346,681 bp

Gene location (Mouse)
Chr.	Chromosome 3 (mouse)
Band	3|3 F2.3	Start	107,232,737 bp
Band	3|3 F2.3	End	107,240,989 bp
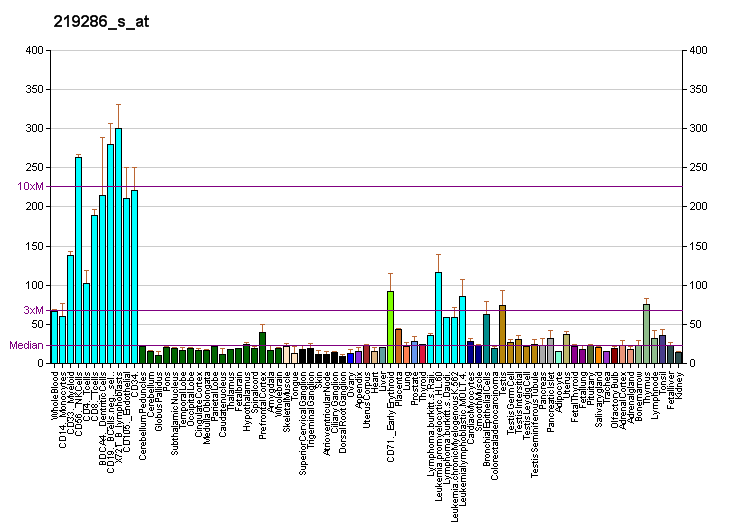
RNA expression pattern
Bgee	Human / Mouse (ortholog); Top expressed in: secondary oocyte; sperm; endothelial cell; Brodmann area 23; gingival epithelium; Epithelium of choroid plexus; middle temporal gyrus; parietal pleura; visceral pleura; epithelium of nasopharynx / Top expressed in: ciliary body; gastrula; lacrimal gland; submandibular gland; abdominal wall; primitive streak; retinal pigment epithelium; fossa; endothelial cell of lymphatic vessel; condyle; More reference expression data
BioGPS	More reference expression data
Gene ontology
Molecular function	protein binding; nucleic acid binding; RNA binding; mRNA binding
Cellular component	nuclear speck; nuclear membrane; membrane; nucleus; nucleoplasm; nuclear envelope; RNA N6-methyladenosine methyltransferase complex
Biological process	branching involved in blood vessel morphogenesis; ventricular septum morphogenesis; mRNA splicing, via spliceosome; placenta blood vessel development; viral process; negative regulation of myeloid cell differentiation; spleen development; negative regulation of transcription, DNA-templated; positive regulation of transcription of Notch receptor target; regulation of alternative mRNA splicing, via spliceosome; RNA methylation; dosage compensation by inactivation of X chromosome; thrombopoietin-mediated signaling pathway; regulation of megakaryocyte differentiation
Sources:Amigo / QuickGO
Orthologs
Databases	NCBI: entry; OMA: entry
Species	Human	Mouse
Entrez	64783	229700
Ensembl	ENSG00000162775	ENSMUSG00000048109
UniProt	Q96T37	Q0VBL3
RefSeq (mRNA)	NM_001201545; NM_022768; NM_014092	NM_001045807
RefSeq (protein)	NP_001188474; NP_073605	NP_001039272
Location (UCSC)	Chr 1: 110.34 – 110.35 Mb	Chr 3: 107.23 – 107.24 Mb
PubMed search
- Wikidata
View/Edit Human	View/Edit Mouse

Putative RNA-binding protein 15 is a protein that in humans is encoded by the RBM15 gene. It is an RNA-binding protein that acts as a key regulator of N6-Methyladenosine (m^{6}A) methylation of RNAs.
