= Polyuridylation =

Polyuridylation, also called oligouridylation, is the addition of several uridine nucleotides to the 3' end of an RNA. Cytoplasmic poly(U) polymerases can add uridine nucleotides to both coding and non-coding RNAs. This addition may occur throughout a variety of RNA types including mRNAs, small RNAs, miRNAs, siRNAs, guide RNAs, or piRNAs. Polyuridylation has been shown to play a role in gene regulation as an evolutionarily conserved process in eukaryotes.

One group of RNAs that can be polyuridylated are histone mRNAs that lack a poly(A) tail. Polyuridylation of a histone mRNA promotes its degradation, involving the exosome. Other RNAs in Arabidopsis and mouse have been seen to be polyuridinylated after cleavage.
