= TRNAMet cytidine acetyltransferase =

Identifiers
- EC no.: 2.3.1.193

Databases
- IntEnz: IntEnz view
- BRENDA: BRENDA entry
- ExPASy: NiceZyme view
- KEGG: KEGG entry
- MetaCyc: metabolic pathway
- PRIAM: profile
- PDB structures: RCSB PDB PDBe PDBsum
Search
- PMC: articles
- PubMed: articles
- NCBI: proteins

TRNAMet cytidine acetyltransferase (EC 2.3.1.193, YpfI, TmcA) is an enzyme with systematic name acetyl-CoA:(elongator tRNAMet)-cytidine^{34} N^{4}-acetyltransferase (ATP-hydrolysing). This enzyme catalyses the following chemical reaction

[elongator tRNAMet]-cytidine^{34} + ATP + acetyl-CoA $\rightleftharpoons$ CoA + [elongator tRNAMet]-N^{4}-acetylcytidine^{34} + ADP + phosphate

The enzyme acetylates the wobble base C^{34} of the CAU anticodon of elongation-specific tRNAMet.
