= Autogamy =

Fusion of gametes from the same individual

Autogamy or self-fertilization refers to the fusion of two gametes that come from one individual. Autogamy is predominantly observed in the form of self-pollination, a reproductive mechanism employed by many flowering plants. However, species of protists have also been observed using autogamy as a means of reproduction. Flowering plants engage in autogamy regularly, while the protists that engage in autogamy only do so in stressful environments.

== Occurrence ==
=== Protists ===
==== Paramecium aurelia ====
Paramecium aurelia is the most commonly studied protozoan for autogamy. Similar to other unicellular organisms, Paramecium aurelia typically reproduce asexually via binary fission or sexually via cross-fertilization. However, studies have shown that when put under nutritional stress, Paramecium aurelia will undergo meiosis and subsequent fusion of gametic-like nuclei. This process, defined as hemixis, a chromosomal rearrangement process, takes place in a number of steps. First, the two micronuclei of P. aurelia enlarge and divide two times to form eight nuclei. Some of these daughter nuclei will continue to divide to create potential future gametic nuclei. Of these potential gametic nuclei, one will divide two more times. Of the four daughter nuclei arising from this step, two of them become anlagen, or cells that will form part of the new organism. The other two daughter nuclei become the gametic micronuclei that will undergo autogamous self-fertilization. These nuclear divisions are observed mainly when the P. aurelia is put under nutritional stress. Research shows that P. aurelia undergo autogamy synchronously with other individuals of the same species.

==== Clonal aging and rejuvenation ====
In Paramecium tetraurelia, vitality declines over the course of successive asexual cell divisions by binary fission. Clonal aging is associated with a dramatic increase in DNA damage. When paramecia that have experienced clonal aging undergo meiosis, either during conjugation or automixis, the old macronucleus disintegrates and a new macronucleus is formed by replication of the micronuclear DNA that had just experienced meiosis followed by syngamy. These paramecia are rejuvenated in the sense of having a restored clonal lifespan. Thus it appears that clonal aging is due in large part to the progressive accumulation of DNA damage, and that rejuvenation is due to repair of DNA damage during meiosis that occurs in the micronucleus during conjugation or automixis and reestablishment of the macronucleus by replication of the newly repaired micronuclear DNA.

==== Tetrahymena rostrata ====
Similar to Paramecium aurelia, the parasitic ciliate Tetrahymena rostrata has also been shown to engage in meiosis, autogamy and development of new macronuclei when placed under nutritional stress. Due to the degeneration and remodeling of genetic information that occurs in autogamy, genetic variability arises and possibly increases an offspring's chances of survival in stressful environments.

==== Allogromia laticollaris ====
Allogromia laticollaris is perhaps the best-studied foraminiferan amoeboid for autogamy. A. laticollaris can alternate between sexual reproduction via cross-fertilization and asexual reproduction via binary fission. The details of the life cycle of A. laticollaris are unknown, but similar to Paramecium aurelia, A. laticollaris is also shown to sometimes defer to autogamous behavior when placed in nutritional stress. As seen in Paramecium, there is some nuclear dimorphism observed in A. laticollaris. There are often observations of macronuclei and chromosomal fragments coexisting in A. laticollaris. This is indicative of nuclear and chromosomal degeneration, a process similar to the subdivisions observed in P. aurelia. Multiple generations of haploid A. laticollaris individuals can exist before autogamy actually takes place. The autogamous behavior in A. laticollaris has the added consequence of giving rise to daughter cells that are substantially smaller than those rising from binary fission. It is hypothesized that this is a survival mechanism employed when the cell is in stressful environments, and thus not able to allocate all resources to creating offspring. If a cell was under nutritional stress and not able to function regularly, there would be a strong possibility of its offspring's fitness being sub-par.

=== Self-pollination in flowering plants ===
About 10–15% of flowering plants are predominantly self-fertilizing. Self-pollination is an example of autogamy that occurs in flowering plants. Self-pollination occurs when the sperm in the pollen from the stamen of a plant goes to the carpels of that same plant and fertilizes the egg cell present. Self-pollination can either be done completely autogamously or geitonogamously. In the former, the egg and sperm cells that unite come from the same flower. In the latter, the sperm and egg cells can come from a different flower on the same plant. While the latter method does blur the lines between autogamous self-fertilization and normal sexual reproduction, it is still considered autogamous self-fertilization.

Self-pollination can lead to inbreeding depression due to expression of deleterious recessive mutations. Meiosis followed by self-pollination results in little genetic variation, raising the question of how meiosis in self-pollinating plants is adaptively maintained over an extended period in preference to a less complicated and less costly asexual ameiotic process for producing progeny. For instance, Arabidopsis thaliana is a predominantly self-pollinating plant that has an outcrossing rate in the wild estimated at less than 0.3%, and self-pollination appears to have evolved roughly a million years ago or more. An adaptive benefit of meiosis that may explain its long-term maintenance in self-pollinating plants is efficient recombinational repair of DNA damage.

=== Fungi ===
There are basically two distinct types of sexual reproduction among fungi. The first is outcrossing (in heterothallic fungi). In this case, mating occurs between two different haploid individuals to form a diploid zygote, that can then undergo meiosis. The second type is self-fertilization or selfing (in homothallic fungi). In this case, two haploid nuclei derived from the same individual fuse to form a zygote than can then undergo meiosis. Examples of homothallic fungi that undergo selfing include species with an aspergillus-like asexual stage (anamorphs) occurring in many different genera, several species of the ascomycete genus Cochliobolus, and the ascomycete Pneumocystis jirovecii (for other examples, see Homothallism). A review of evidence on the evolution of sexual reproduction in the fungi led to the concept that the original mode of sexual reproduction in the last eukaryotic common ancestor was homothallic or self-fertile unisexual reproduction.

== Advantages ==
There are several advantages for the self-fertilization observed in flowering plants and protists. In flowering plants, it is important for some plants not to be dependent on pollinating agents that other plants rely on for fertilization. This is unusual, however, considering that many plant species have evolved to become incompatible with their own gametes. While these species would not be well served by having autogamous self-fertilization as a reproductive mechanism, other species, which do not have self-incompatibility, would benefit from autogamy. Protists have the advantage of diversifying their modes of reproduction. This is useful for a multitude of reasons. First, if there is an unfavorable change in the environment that puts the ability to deliver offspring at risk, then it is advantageous for an organism to have autogamy at its disposal. In other organisms, it is seen that genetic diversity arising from sexual reproduction is maintained by changes in the environment that favor certain genotypes over others. Aside from extreme circumstances, it is possible that this form of reproduction gives rise to a genotype in the offspring that will increase fitness in the environment. This is due to the nature of the genetic degeneration and remodeling intrinsic to autogamy in unicellular organisms. Thus, autogamous behavior may become advantageous to have if an individual wanted to ensure offspring viability and survival. This advantage also applies to flowering plants. This change has not shown to produce a progeny with more fitness in unicellular organisms. It is possible that the nutrition deprived state of the parent cells before autogamy created a barrier for producing offspring that could thrive in those same stressful environments.

== Disadvantages ==
In flowering plants, autogamy has the disadvantage of producing low genetic diversity in the species that use it as the predominant mode of reproduction. This leaves those species particularly susceptible to pathogens and viruses that can harm it. In addition, the foraminiferans that use autogamy have shown to produce substantially smaller progeny as a result. This indicates that since it is generally an emergency survival mechanism for unicellular species, the mechanism does not have the nutritional resources that would be provided by the organism if it were undergoing binary fission.

=== Genetic consequences ===
Self-fertilization results in the loss of genetic variation within an individual (offspring), because many of the genetic loci that were heterozygous become homozygous. This can result in the expression of harmful recessive alleles, which can have serious consequences for the individual. The effects are most extreme when self-fertilization occurs in organisms that are usually out-crossing. In plants, selfing can occur as autogamous or geitonogamous pollinations and can have varying fitness affects that show up as autogamy depression. After several generations, inbreeding depression is likely to purge the deleterious alleles from the population because the individuals carrying them have mostly died or failed to reproduce.

If no other effects interfere, the proportion of heterozygous loci is halved in each successive generation, as shown in the following table.

- Parental $(P)$: $Aa$ x $Aa$ (100%), and in
- $F$_{1} generation gives: $1 AA$ : $2 Aa$: $1 aa$, which means that the frequency of heterozygotes now is 50% of the starting value.
- By the $F$_{10} generation, heterozygotes have almost completely disappeared, and the population is polarized, with almost exclusively homozygous individuals ($AA$ and $aa$)

Illustration model of the decrease in genetic variation in a population of self-fertilized organisms derived from a heterozygous individual, assuming equal fitness
Generation	AA (%)	Aa (%)	aa (%)
P	–	100	–
F_{1}	25	50	25
F_{2}	37.5	25	37.5
F_{3}	43.75	12.5	43.75
F_{4}	46.875	6.25	46.875
F_{5}	48.4375	3.125	48.4375
F_{6}	49.21875	1.5625	49.21875
F_{7}	49.609375	0.78125	49.609375
F_{8}	49.8046875	0.390625	49.8046875
F_{9}	49.90234375	0.1953125	49.90234375
F_{10}	49.995117187 ≈ 50.0	0.09765626 ≈ 0.0	49.995117187 ≈ 50.0

== Evolution ==
The evolutionary shift from outcrossing to self-fertilization is one of the most frequent evolutionary transitions in plants. Since autogamy in flowering plants and autogamy in unicellular species is fundamentally different, and plants and protists are not related, it is likely that both instances evolved separately. However, due to the little overall genetic variation that arises in progeny, it is not fully understood how autogamy has been maintained in the tree of life.

== See also ==
- Effective selfing model
- Parthenogenesis
- Inbreeding
- Outcrossing
- Inbreeding depression
- Outbreeding depression
- Sequential hermaphroditism; the organism spends part of its life as a female and part as a male; self-fertilization is not possible.
