= Late-acting self-incompatibility =

Late-acting self-incompatibility (LSI) is the occurrence of self-incompatibility (SI) in flowering plants where pollen tubes from self-pollen successfully reach the ovary, but ovules fail to develop. Mechanisms that might cause late-acting self-incompatibility have yet to be elucidated. One hypothesis is that the occurrence of LSI is caused by early-acting inbreeding depression where the expression of genetic load causes self-fertilized embryos to abort.

== Advantages and disadvantages of LSI ==
The proposed advantages of LSI compared to normal SI mechanisms is that LSI would allow the maternal parent to evaluate the paternal genetic material and allow ovule development depending on the vigor of developing embryos or amount of resources available.

On the other hand, plants with LSI may face a disadvantage from seed discounting, which results in a reduction in fecundity. When pollen tubes reach the ovule, they are no longer available to be fertilized by outcrossed pollen, meaning LSI still uses up ovules for potential outcrossing while other SI methods do not.

== Evidence supporting LSI ==
Since LSI reactions are said to occur in the ovary and ovules, it is more difficult to researchers to determine where LSI reactions may occur to assess possible LSI mechanisms. Conventional SI reactions are much easier to observe, because they occur in the style or on the stigma. However, research has provided some evidence for the existence of late-acting self-incompatibility. Species noted to possibly have LSI form phylogenetic groupings in a similar fashion to how conventional SI is shared in other phylogenetic groups, suggesting that LSI may be derived from a common ancestor. A study by Lippow and Wyatt reported that species that have LSI create offspring that can be split into different groupings of compatibility and incompatibility based on Mendelian inheritance, which is something that can be demonstrated with plants that have typical SI mechanisms. It is also reported that some plants lack conventional SI mechanisms, yet ovules failed to develop at all, which is unexpected if the mechanism were to be due to lethal alleles.

== Evidence against LSI and alternative explanations ==
Studies have reported evidence against LSI and have proposed alternative explanation. For example, some species that are expected to have LSI display abortion at various stages of seed development, indicating that the abortion was due to selective embryo abortion caused by early-acting inbreeding depression. Another explanation for LSI is that it is the occurrence of gametophytic self-incompatibility, but self-pollen tubes are slowed to the point where they do not achieve fertilization prior to ovule abortion.
