= Black Hereford =

Black Hereford may be:

- Black Hereford (breed), a black colour variety of Hereford cattle recognized as a breed, originally derived from crossbreeding with Angus cattle
- Black Hereford (crossbreed), a cross of Hereford and Holstein-Friesian dairy cattle

== See also ==
- Black Baldy, another black-coloured variety of Hereford/Angus crossbreed
