= Black Hereford (crossbreed) =

Breed of cattle

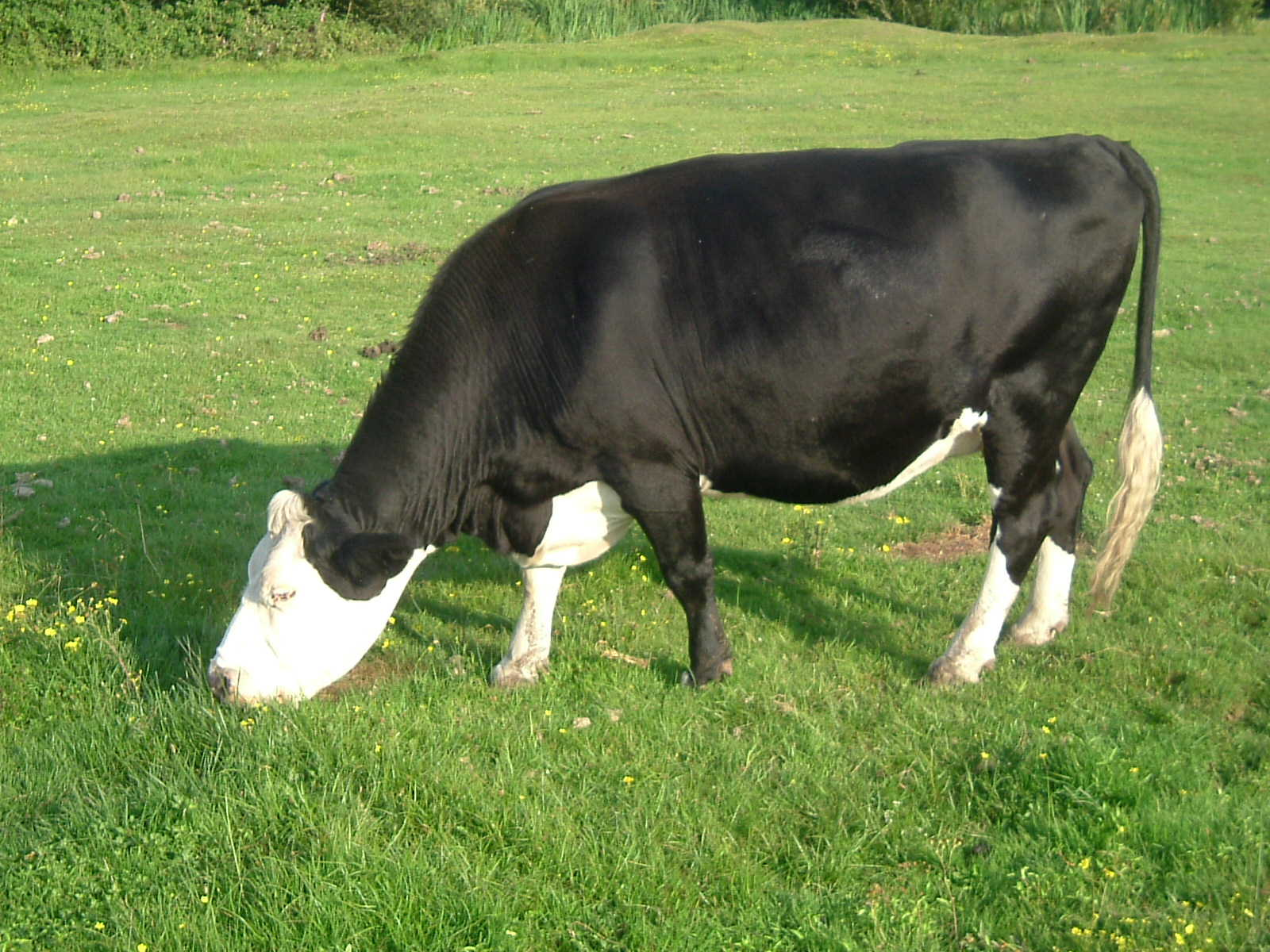
Black Hereford heifer grazing the New Forest in southern England.

The Black Hereford is a crossbreed of beef cattle produced in Britain and Ireland with Hereford beef bulls with Holstein-Friesian dairy cows. Black Herefords are not usually maintained from generation to generation, but are constantly produced as a byproduct of dairy farming as a terminal cross. They are one of the most common types of beef cattle in Britain and Ireland, outnumbering many pure beef breeds.

== Appearance ==
The Black Hereford has a white face like the Hereford, but the red body colour of the Hereford is replaced by black from the Holstein-Friesian – white face and black coat colour are both genetically dominant in cattle. The pied pattern of the Holstein-Friesian does not appear in the offspring.

== Origin ==
Cattle only produce milk after calving, and so every dairy cow must produce a calf every year. In dairy herds (which in Britain and Ireland are almost all Holstein-Friesians), the best milking cows will normally be bred to a dairy bull, usually by artificial insemination (AI). The female purebred dairy calves from these matings will go on to become replacement dairy cows. Half of the purebred calves will, of course, be male – these are mostly not needed for breeding, and are generally unsuitable for beef; they may be reared for veal. Purebred dairy calves are not needed from the rest of the herd, and a beef bull is run with the remaining females to produce crossbred calves suitable for beef – these females will be the poorer-quality cows, the heifers (first-time calvers), and any of the other cows which have not settled (become pregnant) successfully by a bull. The beef bull in this system may be of almost any beef breed, but the Hereford is one of the most widely used – one reason for its popularity is that the white face from the Hereford makes it very easy to avoid confusion between the crossbred and purebred calves at birth.

== Uses ==
Black Herefords are intermediate in type between their beef sires and dairy dams, making them hardy and healthy, and suitable for rearing on grass. When well-grown, all the males and most of the females will normally be killed for beef. Females not needed for beef may be kept for breeding further beef animals – they are put to another beef bull and allowed to rear their own calves on grass as "single sucklers".

== Similar types ==
- The Black Baldy, found in Australia and North America, is another crossbred beef type, black with white head, derived from a Hereford crossed with an Aberdeen Angus.
- The American Black Hereford is a black colour variety of Hereford cattle, originally developed by crossing Hereford and Angus cattle
- The Groningen is a traditional dairy purebred from the Netherlands, black (or sometimes red) with a white head.

== See also ==
- Calf
