= Nuttall's larkspur =

Nuttall's larkspur is a common name for two Delphinium species:

- Delphinium nuttallii
- Delphinium nuttallianum
