= Columbian larkspur =

Columbian larkspur or Columbia larkspur is a common name for several plants and may refer to:

- Delphinium nuttallii, native to Washington and Oregon
- Delphinium trolliifolium, native to Washington, Oregon, and northern California
