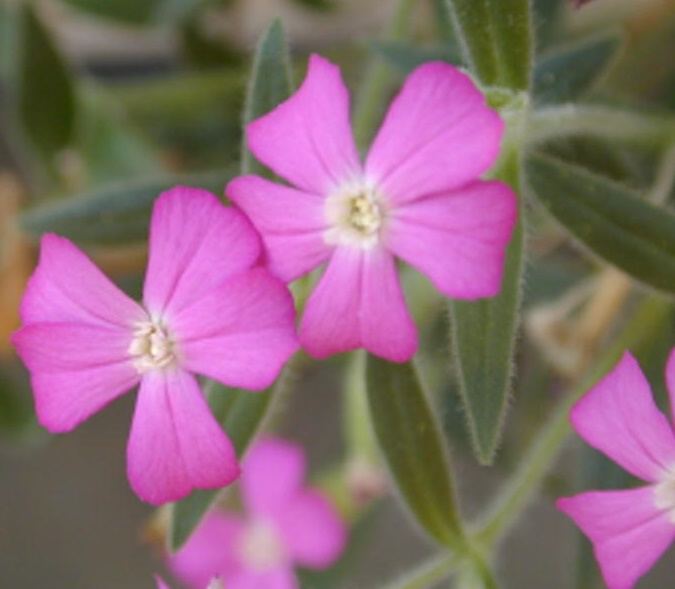

Conservation status
- Endangered (IUCN 3.1)

Scientific classification
- Kingdom: Plantae
- Clade: Tracheophytes
- Clade: Angiosperms
- Clade: Eudicots
- Order: Caryophyllales
- Family: Caryophyllaceae
- Genus: Silene
- Species: S. diclinis

Binomial name
- Silene diclinis (Lag.) M.Laínz

Synonyms
- Lychnis diclinis Lag.

= Silene diclinis =

Species of flowering plant

Silene diclinis is a species of plant in the family Caryophyllaceae. It is endemic to Spain. Its natural habitat is pastureland. It is threatened by habitat loss and is classified as an endangered species by the IUCN. It is dioecious, with separate male and female plants. It forms a clade with several other species that are dioecious.

== Distribution and habitat ==
Silene diclinis is a perennial herb in the family Caryophyllaceae, closely allied to the widespread European species S. dioica and S. latifolia (section Elisanthe). It is strictly endemic to eastern Spain, where its only known wild population occurs on calcareous pastureland above Játiva (Valencia province). A 1978 survey recorded roughly 500–600 flowering individuals divided into three spatially separated subpopulations. This restricted, fragmented distribution has persisted since at least the late 19th century, when Pau (1896) first noted its rarity, and remains imperilled by ongoing encroachment of matorral scrub, which suppresses flowering and reduces suitable open‐habitat area.

== Reproductive biology ==
Silene diclinis is dioecious, bearing separate male and female plants, and reproduces exclusively by seed. Wild individuals are long‐lived (most are presumed to be over five years old, with very few juveniles observed), and cultivated progeny show roughly 50 percent germination from wild‐collected seed, with post‐germination mortality of only about 3 percent over two years. Greenhouse‐grown plants have attained ages beyond ten years, indicating considerable longevity in both wild and cultivated settings.

Populations of S. diclinis show a consistent female‐biased sex ratio: in subpopulations A and C the proportion of male individuals among flowering plants was about 0.37, significantly below the 1:1 expectation. This bias is present in both wild and cultivated samples and is thought to arise from "certation" (pollen competition) under an XY sex-determination system, whereby X-chromosome–bearing pollen grains fertilise ovules more effectively than Y-bearing grains. The presence of heteromorphic X and Y chromosomes in this species has been confirmed, placing S. diclinis securely within the dioecious members of section Elisanthe.
