= Terminal crossbreeding =

Terminal crossbreeding is a breeding system used in animal production. It involves two (different) breeds of animal that have been crossbred. The female offspring of that cross is then mated with a male (the terminal male) of a third breed, producing the terminal crossbred animal.

The first crossbreeding may produce a superior animal due to hybrid vigor. Often, this crossbreed is part of a rotational crossbreeding scheme; if it also incorporates terminal crossbreeding, it is then called a rotaterminal system. By mating the crossbreed with a third breed, hybrid vigor may be further enhanced.

== See also ==
- Artificial selection
- Dog hybrids and crossbreeds
- Purebred
- Selective breeding
- Outcross
