= Selective embryo abortion =

Selective seed death in plants

Selective embryo abortion (also known as selective seed abortion and selective ovule abortion ), is a form of non-random, premature termination of embryonic development in plants. Selective embryo abortion assumes that embryo termination depends on the genetic quality of seeds developing within an ovary, and predicts that successfully matured seeds will be of greater fitness than aborted seeds. Consequently, selective embryo abortion has the potential to act as a unique stage of natural selection, influencing the evolution of plant populations and species. This concept was described by botanist John T. Buchholz in 1922 under his framework of developmental selection, which referred to selective embryo abortion as “interovular selection.”

Selective embryo abortion may result from competition among embryos for maternal resources. The maternal plant may also play an active role by recognizing and selectively aborting genetically inferior embryos.

Evidence of offspring fitness effects support the hypothesis that abortion is a form of selection. However, abortion in some species may be due to factors independent of embryo fitness, including the position of embryos within an ovary and late-acting self-incompatibility.

== Mechanisms of selective embryo abortion ==
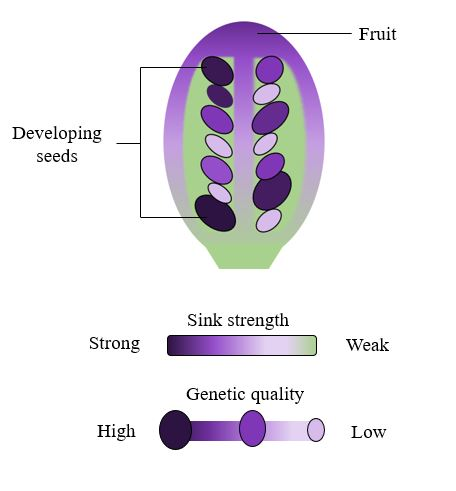
Representation of the source-sink hypothesis as it relates to selective embryo abortion; embryos of high genetic quality are expected to be stronger sinks for maternal resources.

The body of literature on selective embryo abortion was primarily published in the 1980s. During this time period, researchers proposed and investigated several hypotheses for the mechanisms of selective embryo abortion. These can be broadly grouped into two camps: competition among developing embryos and active “female choice.” The former suggests that selective embryo abortion is driven by interactions among embryos as they compete for maternal resources such as sugars, water, and minerals. From the perspective of the source-sink hypothesis, each embryo acts as a sink, or recipient, of finite resources from roots and photosynthetic tissues. Since resources are limited, the number of existing ovules would be greater than the number of seeds the maternal plant can support, leading to competition for resources. Embryos may compete for resources by producing phytohormones involved in metabolism (such as auxin). Competition may also involve the production of biochemicals that directly hinder the development and growth of other embryos. In contrast, the hypothesis of female choice states that selective embryo abortion may be driven by the maternal plant, which identifies and aborts inferior embryos. However, it is unclear how the maternal plant may be able to assess genetic quality. It is possible, however, that interactions between the maternal plant and competing embryos may affect patterns of seed abortion; for example, patterns of resource consumption among embryos may signal to the maternal plant which embryos are of low fitness.

Selective embryo abortion can also occur indirectly through fruit abortion. Indeed, seed and fruit development are interrelated and occur simultaneously. Accordingly, seed maturation—and therefore seed success—can be precluded by fruit abortion.

== Effects on offspring fitness ==
In general, there is significant overlap in gene expression between embryo development and plant maturation. Selective embryo abortion may therefore act on traits affecting plant survival and fitness following germination.

Most studies that tested the effects of selective embryo abortion on offspring fitness, did so by reducing or eliminating competition among embryos; these studies typically evaluate differences in average fitness between offspring from unmanipulated plants and offspring from plants manipulated by random removal of embryos. Relative increases in certain measures of fitness among the former have been observed in species such as Cryptantha flava, Cryptantha officinale, Lotus Corniculatus, and others.

== Position-dependent abortion ==
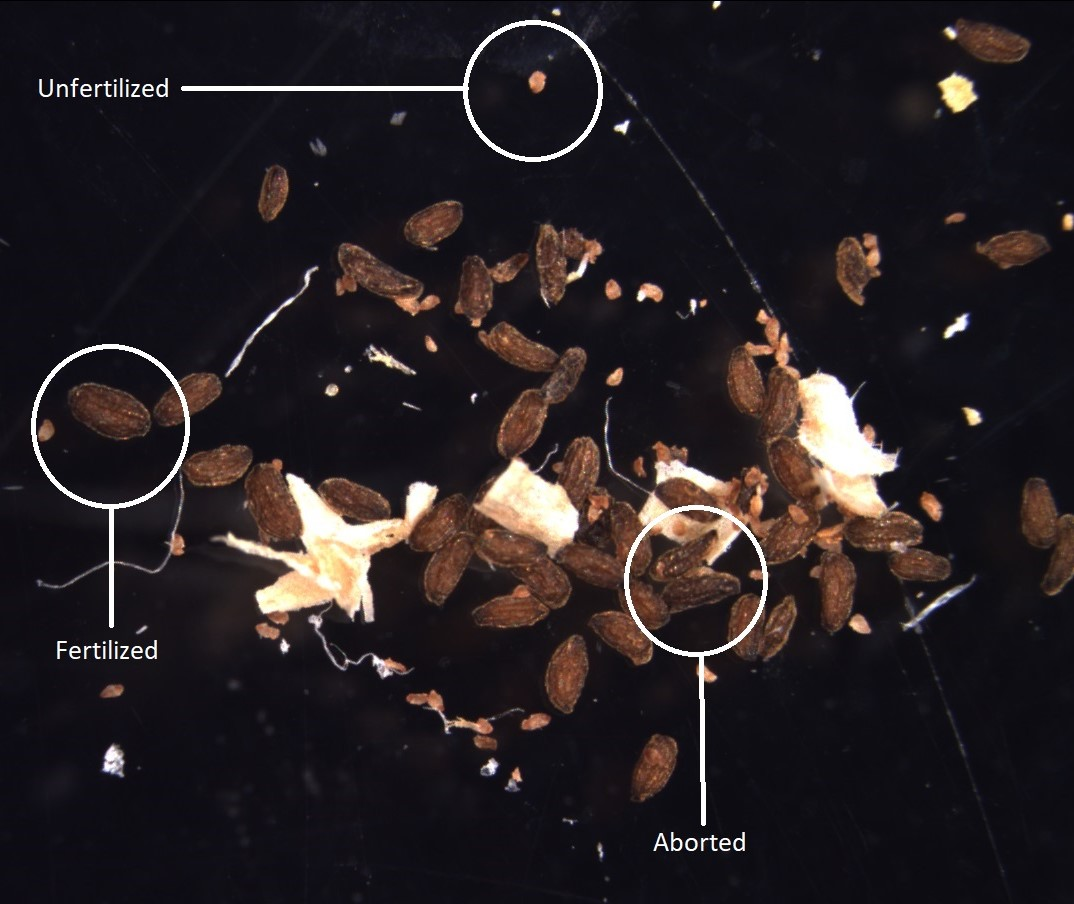
Matured seeds, aborted seeds, and unfertilized ovules of Mimulus guttatus (monkeyflower).

Many species exhibit less variable patterns of embryo abortion. In species such as Medicago lupulinus, Nemophila breviflora, and Phaseolus coccineus, abortion appears to be affected by the relative position of an ovule within an ovary. A variety of within-ovary, position-dependent patterns have been observed, including:

- Consistent maturation of embryos in particular positions
- Greater probability of abortion among embryos closer to the style
- Greater probability of abortion among embryos closer to the peduncle
- Greater probability of maturation among embryos in the middle portion of the ovary
- Alternation between matured and aborted embryos

M. lupulinus and N. breviflora are also examples of species with a fixed number of matured seeds per fruit (in these cases, one seed), despite having multiple fertilized ovules.

The arrangement of ovarian vascular bundles, which transport nutrients to ovules, has been proposed as a potential influence on position-dependent probabilities of abortion. Alternatively, in species where the order of ovule fertilization and relative positions of matured embryos correlate, fertilization time may have an effect; late-fertilized ovules are expected to lag behind in embryonic development, making them weaker competitors. More specifically, gametophytic selection may cause a correlation between fertilization order and position of matured embryos, since the fastest growing pollen tubes are expected to be the most fit and the first to fertilize ovules. In this scenario, the ovules fertilized first are expected to be stronger competitors due to their genetic quality, hence their higher probability of maturation. Thus, some cases of position-dependent abortion have the potential to be driven by selective embryo abortion.

== Abortion of self-fertilized embryos ==
Early-acting inbreeding depression is a form of selective embryo abortion that acts on embryos produced by selfing or mating of close relatives. Inbreeding increases genetic homozygosity, allowing selection to elimination recessive, deleterious or lethal alleles (the presence of these deleterious alleles is referred to as genetic load). Thus, selective embryo abortion would be expected to purge genetic load among inbred offspring by aborting those embryos with deleterious genotypes. However, late-acting self-incompatibility also causes abortion of self-fertilized seeds, confounding identification of early-acting inbreeding depression.
