= Geitonogamy =

Term for a pollination strategy in plants

Geitonogamy (from Greek geiton (γείτων) = neighbor + gamein (γαμεῖν) = to marry) is a type of self-pollination. Geitonogamous pollination is sometimes distinguished from the fertilizations that can result from it, geitonogamy. If a plant is self-incompatible, geitonogamy can reduce seed production.

In flowering plants, pollen is transferred from a flower to another flower on the same plant, and in animal pollinated systems this is accomplished by a pollinator visiting multiple flowers on the same plant. Geitonogamy is also possible within species that are wind-pollinated, and may actually be a quite common source of self-fertilized seeds in self-compatible species. It also occurs in monoecious gymnosperms.

Empirical work shows that geitonogamy is seldom a marginal process: in many flowering plants it represents a sizeable share of all pollen transfer and its incidence rises steeply as the number of simultaneously open flowers on a plant increases. Field experiments and pollen-movement models indicate that a plant with ten open flowers may experience about 13% geitonogamous pollen receipt, whereas a display of fifty flowers can push that figure beyond 45%; at the same time, pollen export per flower drops sharply as self-delivery soaks up the grains that would otherwise reach neighbouring individuals.

Because pollen retained within the parent plant earns little or no male fitness and may interfere with female success, geitonogamy carries measurable costs. In self-incompatible species experimental precedence of self-pollen has reduced subsequent seed set by up to 40%, whereas in self-compatible taxa any level of inbreeding depression means that seeds sired through geitonogamy are, on average, less fit than outcrossed progeny. These effects are especially pronounced in large, many-flowered clones, helping to explain selection for traits—such as staggered flowering, directional nectar gradients or architectural arrangements that guide pollinators away from older female-phase flowers—that reduce successive visits to blossoms on the same individual.

== See also ==
- Plant reproductive morphology
- Self-fertilization
- Autogamy Depression
