= Partial dominance hypothesis =

In genetics, the partial dominance hypothesis states that inbreeding depression is the result of the frequency increase of homozygous deleterious recessive or partially recessive alleles. The hypothesis can be explained by looking at a population that is divided into a large number of separately inbred lines. Deleterious alleles will eventually be eliminated from some lines and become fixed in other lines, while some lines disappear because of fixation of deleterious alleles. This will cause an overall decline in population and trait value, but then increase to a trait value that is equal to or greater than the trait value in the original population. Crossing inbred lines restores fitness in the overdominance hypothesis and a fitness increase in the partial dominance hypothesis.
