= Gametophytic selection =

Gametophytic selection is the selection of one haploid pollen grain over another through the means of pollen competition (see also certation), and the resulting sporophytic generations are positively affected by this competition. Evidence for the positive effects of gametophytic selection on the sporophyte generation has been observed in several flowering plant species, but there is still some debate as to the biological significance of gametophytic selection.

== Non-random success of pollen tubes ==
=== Pollen competition hypothesis ===
The competitive ability of pollen grains (microgapmetophytes) is rooted in the expression of their haploid genomes. The haploid genes are expressed immediately after pollen development and during pollen germination and pollen-tube growth. About 60% of genes expressed in the sporophyte are also expressed in the microgametophyte. This expression influences the ability of pollen tubes to compete during growth. When pollen competition occurs, the competitive ability is determined by differences between tube growth rate or the time it takes for germination to occur. Pollen completion is increased when pollen is not limiting and when pollen is in abundance relative to the number of ovules present in the ovary, but this does not guarantee pollen competition.

=== Non-random success of pollen ===
Studies on corn have observed a non-random success of pollen grains possessing different alleles resulting in ratios that differ from those expected by Mendel's Law of Segregation of Genes (certation). Pollen from a heterozygous sporophyte should exhibit an equal distribution of gametes inherited by offspring. Evidence of higher fertilization frequencies by pollen carrying one allele resulted in differences from expected random mating ratios.

== Offspring quality ==
Evidence suggests that gametophytic selection may influence the fitness of seedlings in the next sporophytic generation. Studies on specific species have observed improvement of offspring quality suggesting that the rate of pollen-tube growth in the style is positively correlated with the rate of seedling growth in the next generation. In experiments, Dianthus chinensis demonstrated that when pollen tubes had to grow a longer distance through the style the offspring had increased vigor and competitive ability. Pollen competition is also one of the primary drivers for cryptic self-incompatibility favoring outcrossed pollen for fertilization.

=== Reduced inbreeding depression ===
Faster pollen tube growth rate in Dalechampia scandens results in reduced inbreeding depression in mixed-mating systems due to intense pollen competition after self-pollination. Gametophytic selection was apparently responsible for increased seed mass and radicle growth in selfed seedlings.

=== Sex ratios ===
Experiments on Rumex hastatulus demonstrated that sex ratio differences were not induced by environmental or biotic variables, but that pollen competition did result in skewed sex ratios.

=== Seedless tracheophytes vs. angiosperms ===
Current hypotheses suggest that gametophytic selection in early seedless land plants would have seen negative repercussions due to the limitations imposed by environmental selection on independent gametophytes, like those of bryophytes and ferns. Polyploidy may have been a mechanism that avoided these repercussions in modern ferns.

Flowering plants may have seen benefits from gametophytic selection occurring during pollen-tube growth in the style. It has been proposed that gametophytic selection contributed to the radiation of flowering plants with closed carpels and more efficient pollen transfer by insects enhancing selective pressure on microgametophytes.

== Alternative hypotheses to pollen competition ==
The biological importance of gametophytic selection continues to be a subject of discussion. Suggestions have been made that the significance of the heritable ability of the genes passed on from haploid gametes may not significant and that differences in the number of pollen grains on the stigma or the distance pollen tubes travel through the style may have promoted differences in seed provisioning that resulted in differences in seedling growth instead of heritable genetic differences resulting from pollen competition.
