= Developmental selection =

Developmental selection is selection that occurs on developmental units in an organism, such as cell lineages, embryos, and gametes or gametophytes. Generally, developmental selection is differentiated from natural selection because the targets of selection are internal to an organism contain the developmental units, rather than selection due to external environmental factors that favor specific phenotypes. However, in animals, developmental selection against offspring can manifest in the external environment, in which parents might select against offspring with developmental instabilities, or when offspring with deleterious malformations may not survive.

== Developmental selection in plants ==
=== Selective embryo abortion ===
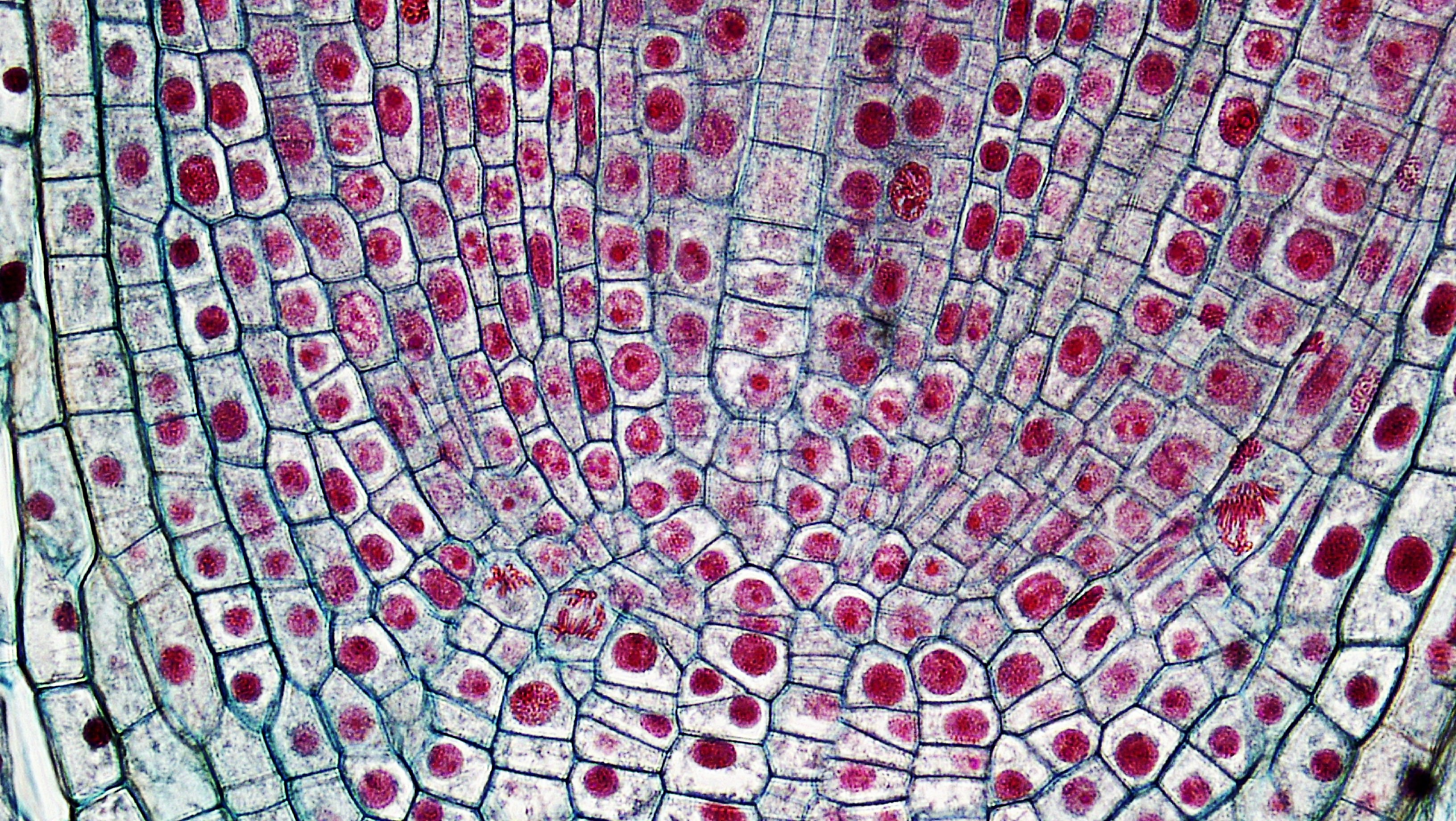
Apical meristem of a root. Cells with high-fitness mutations can populate the tip of the meristem as they outpace the growth and division of lower-fitness cells.

A common form of developmental selection in plants is selective ovule abortion, where the maternal parent selects against unstable embryos. Abortion of low-viability offspring may be driven by either genetic factors or environmental stress. Developmental selection may also occur as the loss of embryos through expressed mutations in developing embryos that cause them to be unable to successfully survive, or from competition for maternal resources among the developing embryos.

=== Gametophytic selection ===
Developmental selection during the haploid life stage of plants may occur through gametophytic selection due to pollen competition and self-incompatibility. Gametophytic selection occurs when a large amount of pollen is deposited on the stigma, and may either occur by pollen competition or by the maternal plant inhibiting self-pollen or pollen from other species.

=== Cell lineage selection ===
Developmental selection can also occur as cell lineage selection due to differential growth rates among germ cell lineages in the apical meristem. In cell lineage selection, favorable mutations that arise in the meristem of plants are selected for and proliferate to become the dominant cells comprising the tip of the meristem, while deleterious mutations are selected against. This kind of selection can help to remove low-fitness meiotic and somatic mutations from populations of plants. This selection is analogous to somatic evolution in cancer.

== Developmental selection in animals ==
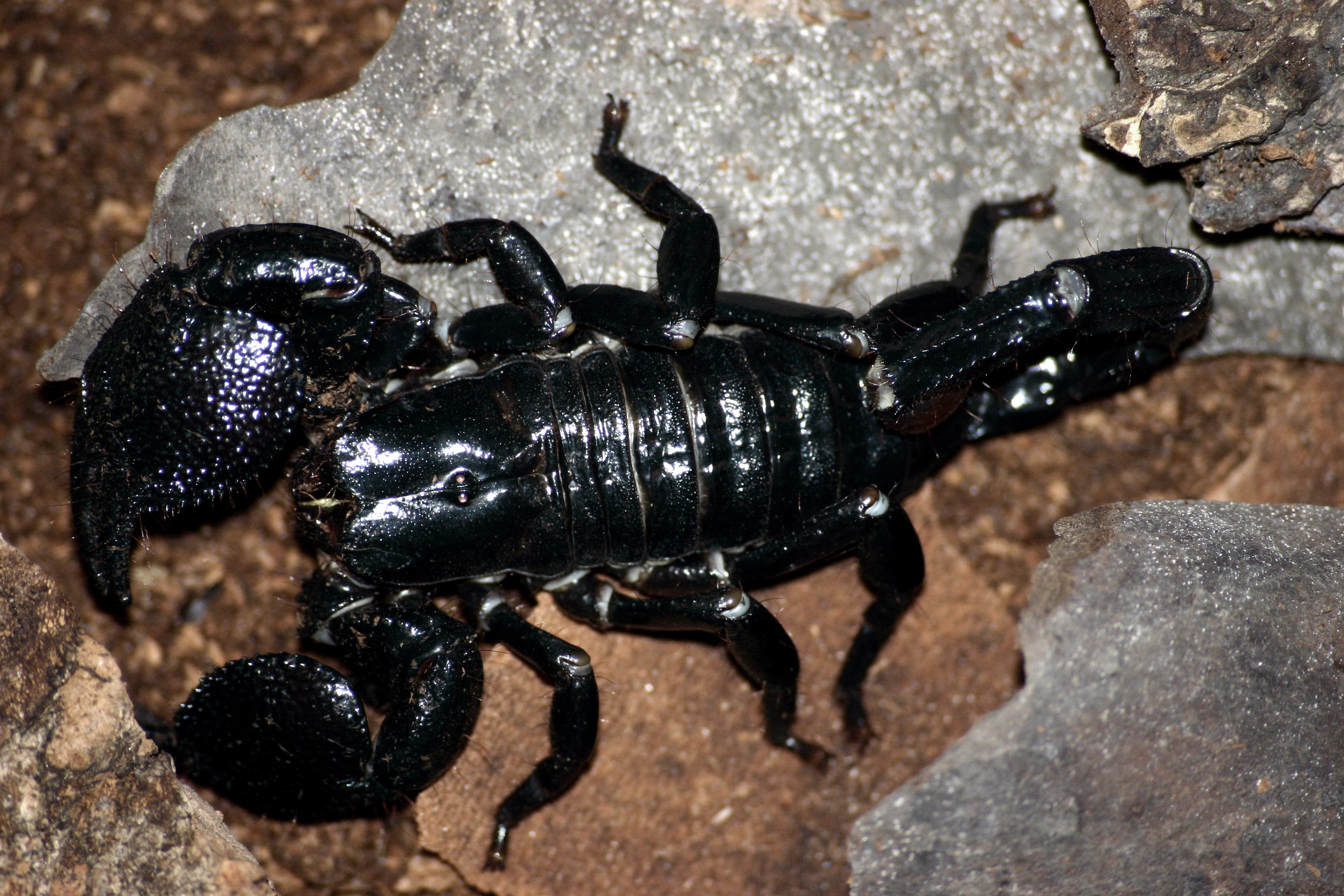
Pandinus imperator, the offspring of this scorpion climb onto the back of the mother after they are born. If any malformations are present which cause them to fail to climb, they are eaten by the mother.

Developmental selection can also occur in animals. Like with pollen competition, sperm is often produced in excess compared to the number of available eggs that can be fertilized. Thus, sperm competition displays developmental selection by selecting against gametes with morphologies that inhibit their success in fertilization. Poorly developed sperm can be also produced by environmental stressors that cause improper development in organisms.

Developmental selection may also occur in the living offspring of animals. This tends to occur as malformations in developing offspring that inhibit their survival. Malformed or otherwise abnormally developed offspring may be selected against by the parents. For example, in house mice, the newly born pups are eaten by the mother if they do not squeak or cry out when the mother eats the umbilical cord connecting to the pup.
