= Pedicel (botany) =

Structure connecting flowers or fruit to the main stem of a plant

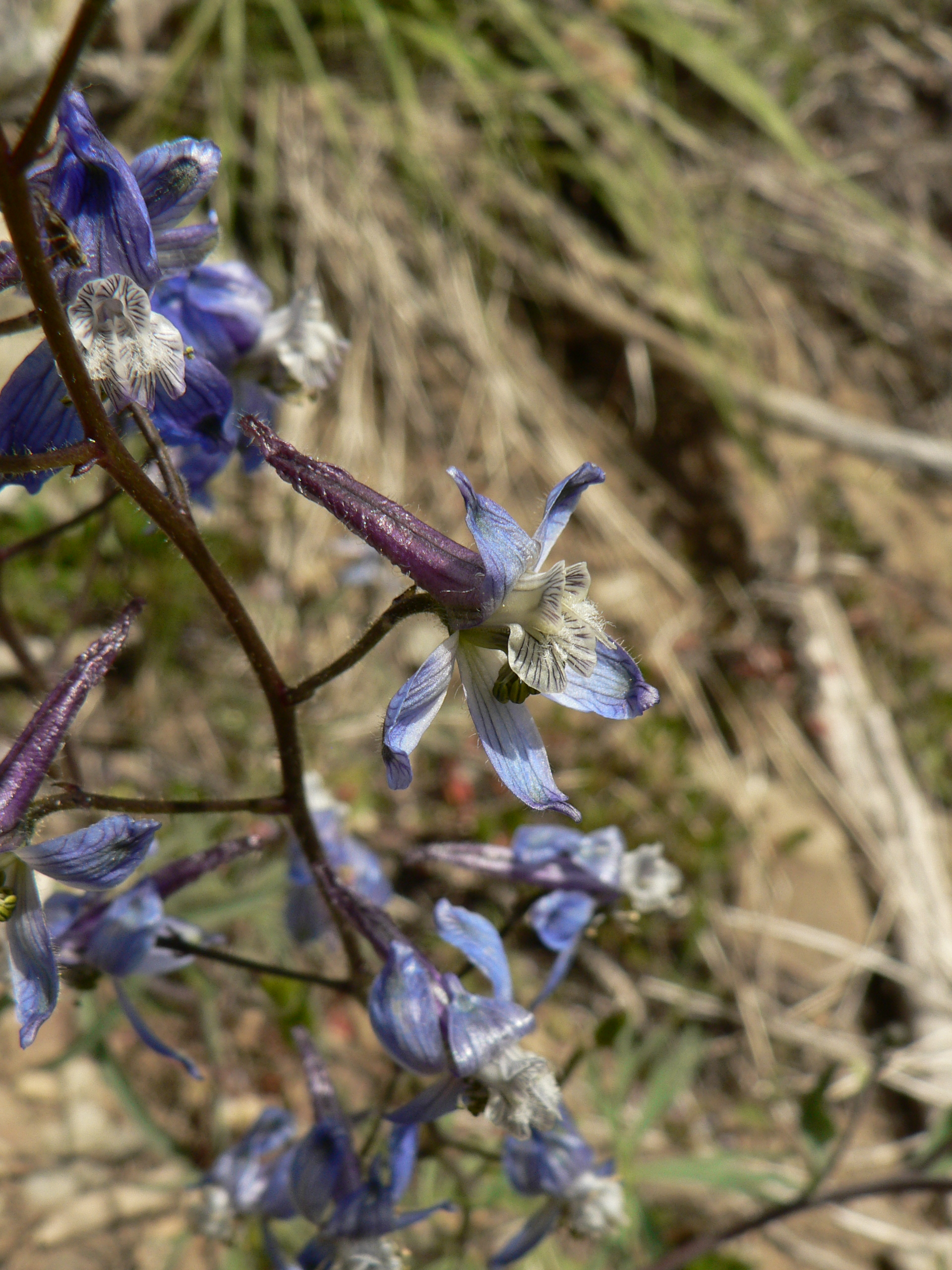
The inflorescence of Delphinium nuttallianum. Each flower is held on a pedicel from one to several centimeters long.

In botany, a pedicel (Latin: pedicellus) attaches a single flower to a stalk of its inflorescence, or a fruit to its stalk. Flowers attached as such are described as pedicellate.

== Description ==
Pedicel refers to a structure connecting a single flower to its inflorescence. In the absence of a pedicel, the flowers are described as sessile. Pedicel is also applied to the stem of the infructescence. The stem or branch from the main stem of the inflorescence that holds a group of pedicels is called a peduncle. A pedicel may be associated with a bract or bracts. In fruit-bearing plants such as pears (Pyrus species), differences in pedicel length, diameter, and tissue composition influence fruit size, firmness, and sugar content.

== In cultivation ==
In Halloween types of pumpkin or squash plants, the shape of the pedicel has received particular attention because plant breeders are trying to optimize the size and shape of the pedicel for the best "lid" for a "jack-o'-lantern".

Diagram of flower parts

== Gallery ==
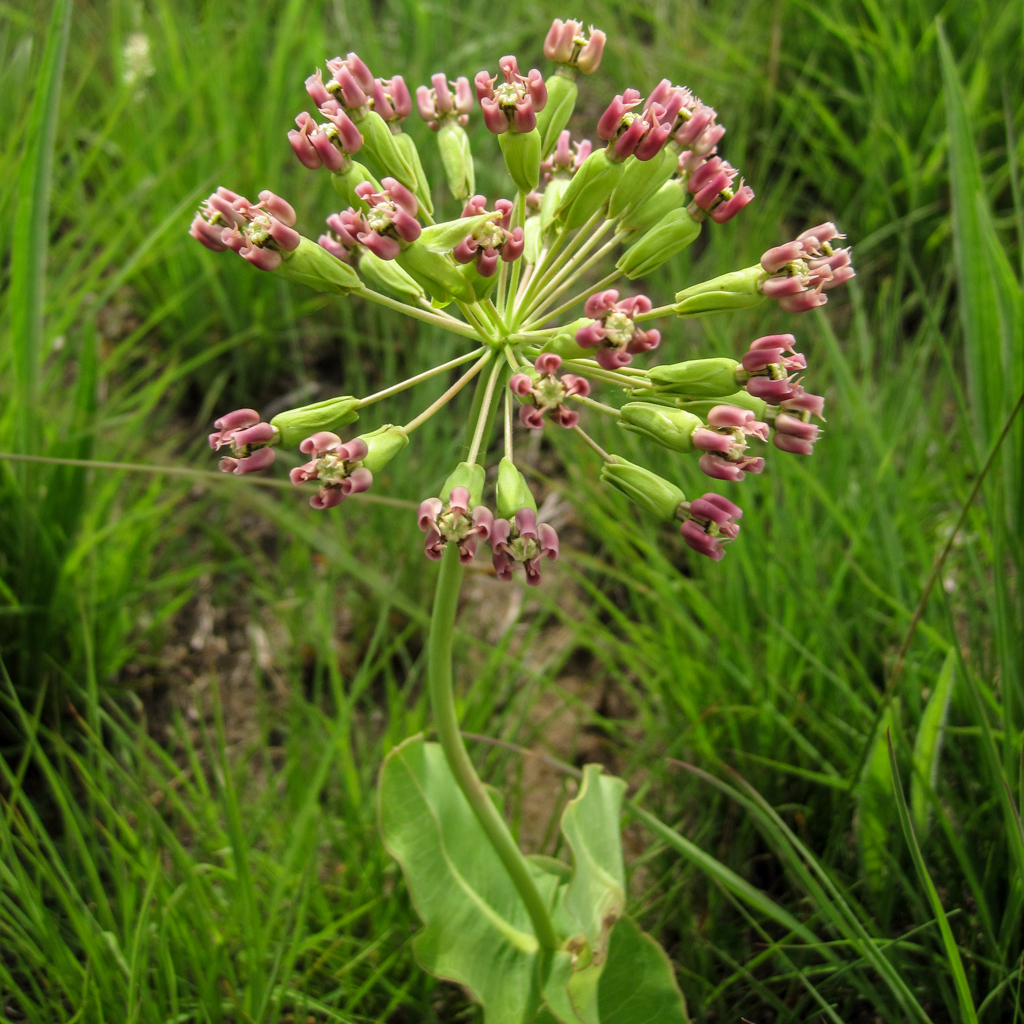
Long pedicels of clasping milkweed with a single peduncle

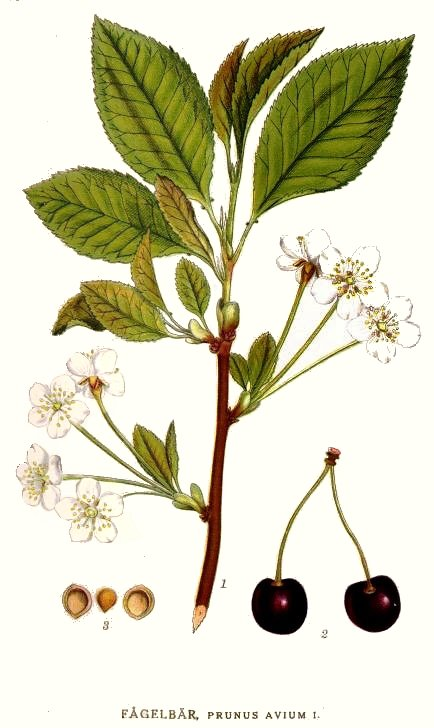
Cherry pedicels in flower and fruit (drawing)

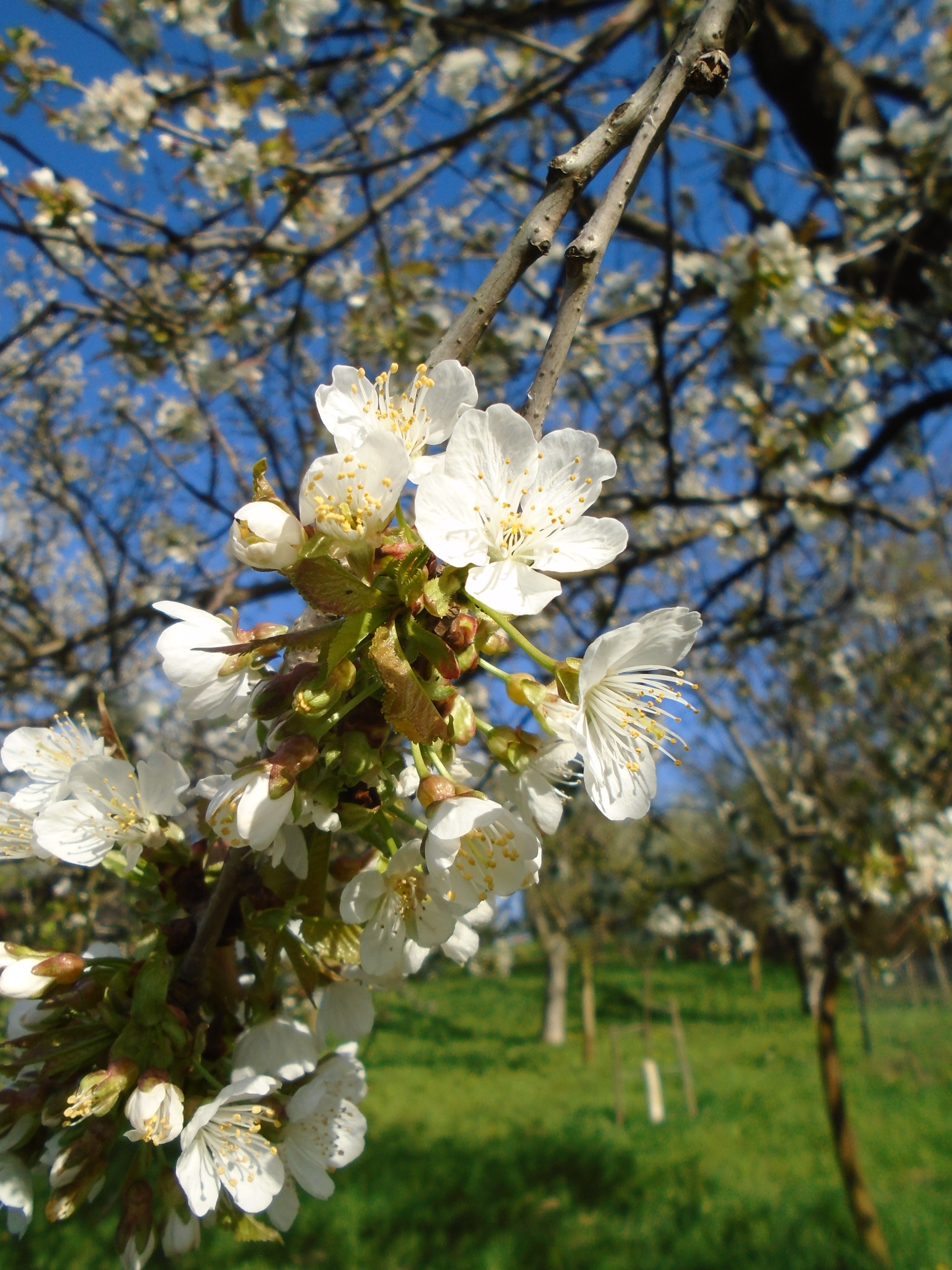
Cherry pedicels in flower (photo)

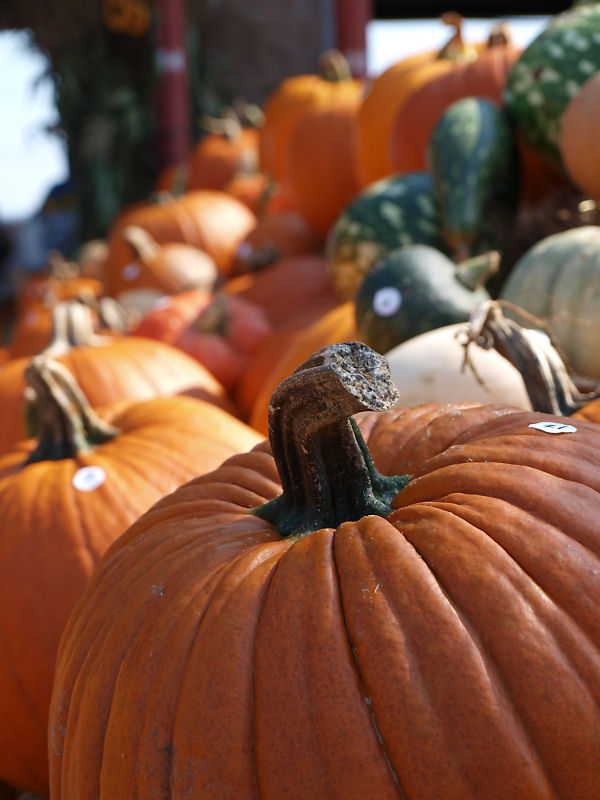
Pumpkin pedicel

== See also ==
- Petiole, stalk at the base of a leaf.
- Sessile
- Scape

== Bibliography ==
- Pedicel: Plant part. Encyclopædia Britannica.
