= Outbreeding depression =

Reduced biological fitness

In biology, outbreeding depression happens when crosses between two genetically distant groups or populations result in a reduction of fitness. The concept is in contrast to inbreeding depression, although the two effects can occur simultaneously on different traits. Outbreeding depression is a risk that sometimes limits the potential for genetic rescue or augmentations. It is considered a postzygotic response, for it is noted usually in the performance of the progeny.

Outbreeding depression manifests in two ways:

- Generating intermediate genotypes that are less fit than either parental form. For example, selection in one population might favor a large body size, whereas in another population, small body size might be more advantageous, while individuals with intermediate body sizes are comparatively disadvantaged in both populations. As another example, in the Tatra Mountains, the introduction of ibex from the Middle East resulted in hybrids which produced calves at the coldest time of the year.
- Breakdown of biochemical or physiological compatibility. Within isolated breeding populations, alleles are selected in the context of the local genetic background. Because the same alleles may have rather different effects in different genetic backgrounds, this can result in different locally coadapted gene complexes. Outcrossing between individuals with differently adapted gene complexes can result in disruption of this selective advantage, resulting in a loss of fitness.

== Mechanisms ==
The different mechanisms of outbreeding depression can operate at the same time. However, determining which mechanism is likely to occur in a particular population can be very difficult.

There are three main mechanisms for generating outbreeding depression:

1. Fixed chromosomal differences resulting in the partial or complete sterility of F_{1} hybrids.
2. Adaptive differentiation among populations
3. Population bottlenecks and genetic drift

Some mechanisms may not appear until two or more generations later (F_{2} or greater), when recombination has undermined vitality of positive epistasis. Hybrid vigor in the first generation can, in some circumstances, be strong enough to mask the effects of outbreeding depression. An example of this is that plant breeders will make F_{1} hybrids from purebred strains, which will improve the uniformity and vigor of the offspring; however, the F_{2} generation are not used for further breeding because of unpredictable phenotypes in their offspring. Unless there is strong selective pressure, outbreeding depression can increase in further generations as coadapted gene complexes are broken apart without the forging of new coadapted gene complexes to take their place. If the outcrossing is limited and populations are large enough, selective pressure acting on each generation can restore fitness. Unless the F_{1} hybrid generation is sterile or very low fitness, selection will act in each generation using the increased diversity to adapt to the environment. This can lead to recovery in fitness to baseline, and sometimes even greater fitness than original parental types in that environment. However, as the hybrid population will likely go through a decline in fitness for a few generations, they will need to persist long enough to allow selection to act before they can rebound.

== Examples ==
The first mechanism has the greatest effects on fitness for polyploids, an intermediate effect on translocations, and a modest effect on centric fusions and inversions. Generally, this mechanism will be more prevalent in the first generation (F_{1}) after the initial outcrossing when most individuals are made up of the intermediate phenotype.

Examples of the second mechanism include stickleback fish, which developed benthic and limnetic forms when separated. When crosses occurred between the two forms, there were low spawning rates. However, when the same forms mated with each other and no crossing occurred between lakes, the spawning rates were normal. This pattern has also been studied in Drosophila and leaf beetles, where the F_{1} progeny and later progeny resulted in intermediate fitness between the two parents. This circumstance is more likely to happen and occurs more quickly with selection than with genetic drift.

For the third mechanism, examples include poison dart frogs, anole lizards, and cichlid fish. Selection over genetic drift seems to be the dominant mechanism for outbreeding depression.

== In plants ==
For plants, outbreeding depression represents a partial crossing barrier. Outbreeding depression is not understood well in angiosperms. After observing Ipomopsis aggregata over time by crossing plants that were between 10–100 m apart, a pattern was noticed that plants that were farther away spatially had a higher likelihood of outbreeding depression. Some general takeaways from this were that spatial patterns of selection on plant genotypes will vary in scale and pattern, and outbreeding depression reflects the genetic constitution of "hybrid" progeny and the environments in which the parents and progeny grow. This means that although outbreeding depression cannot be predicted in angiosperms yet, the environment has a role in it.

== See also ==
- Dominance versus overdominance
- Haldane's rule
- Heterozygote advantage
- Inbreeding depression
