= Heterosis =

Difference in a quantitative trait between heterozygous and homozygous genotypes

Time course imaging of two maize inbreds and their F1 hybrid (middle) exhibiting heterosis.

Heterosis, hybrid vigor, or outbreeding enhancement is the improved or increased function of any biological quality in a hybrid offspring. An offspring is heterotic if its traits are enhanced as a result of mixing the genetic contributions of its parents. The heterotic offspring often has traits that are more than the simple addition of the parents' traits, and can be explained by Mendelian or non-Mendelian inheritance. Typical heterotic/hybrid traits of interest in agriculture are higher yield, quicker maturity, stability, drought tolerance, etc.

== Definitions ==
In proposing the term heterosis to replace the older term heterozygosis, G.H. Shull aimed to avoid limiting the term to the effects that can be explained by heterozygosity in Mendelian inheritance.

The physiological vigor of an organism as manifested in its rapidity of growth, its height and general robustness, is positively correlated with the degree of dissimilarity in the gametes by whose union the organism was formed … The more numerous the differences between the uniting gametes — at least within certain limits — the greater on the whole is the amount of stimulation … These differences need not be Mendelian in their inheritance … To avoid the implication that all the genotypic differences which stimulate cell-division, growth and other physiological activities of an organism are Mendelian in their inheritance and also to gain brevity of expression I suggest … that the word 'heterosis' be adopted.

Heterosis is often discussed as the opposite of inbreeding depression, although differences in these two concepts can be seen in evolutionary considerations such as the role of genetic variation or the effects of genetic drift in small populations on these concepts. Inbreeding depression occurs when related parents have children with traits that negatively influence their fitness largely due to homozygosity. In such instances, outcrossing should result in heterosis.

Not all outcrosses result in heterosis. For example, when a hybrid inherits traits from its parents that are not fully compatible, fitness can be reduced. This is a form of outbreeding depression, the effects of which are similar to inbreeding depression.

== Genetic and epigenetic bases ==
Since the early 1900s, two competing genetic hypotheses, not necessarily mutually exclusive, have been developed to explain hybrid vigor. More recently, an epigenetic component of hybrid vigor has also been established.

=== Dominance and overdominance ===
When a population is small or inbred, it tends to lose genetic diversity. Inbreeding depression is the loss of fitness due to loss of genetic diversity. Inbred strains tend to be homozygous for recessive alleles that are mildly harmful (or produce a trait that is undesirable from the standpoint of the breeder). Heterosis or hybrid vigor, on the other hand, is the tendency of outbred strains to exceed both inbred parents in fitness.

Selective breeding of plants and animals, including hybridization, began long before there was an understanding of underlying scientific principles. In the early 20th century, after Mendel's laws came to be understood and accepted, geneticists undertook to explain the superior vigor of many plant hybrids. Two competing hypotheses, which are not mutually exclusive, were developed:

Genetic basis of heterosis. Dominance hypothesis. Scenario A. Fewer genes are under-expressed in the homozygous individual. Gene expression in the offspring is equal to the expression of the fittest parent. Overdominance hypothesis. Scenario B. Over-expression of certain genes in the heterozygous offspring. (The size of the circle depicts the expression level of gene A)

- Dominance hypothesis. The dominance hypothesis attributes the superiority of hybrids to the suppression of undesirable recessive alleles from one parent by dominant alleles from the other. It attributes the poor performance of inbred strains to loss of genetic diversity, with the strains becoming purely homozygous at many loci. The dominance hypothesis was first expressed in 1908 by the geneticist Charles Davenport. Under the dominance hypothesis, deleterious alleles are expected to be maintained in a random-mating population at a selection–mutation balance that would depend on the rate of mutation, the effect of the alleles and the degree to which alleles are expressed in heterozygotes.
- Overdominance hypothesis. Certain combinations of alleles that can be obtained by crossing two inbred strains are advantageous in the heterozygote. The overdominance hypothesis attributes the heterozygote advantage to the survival of many alleles that are recessive and harmful in homozygotes. It attributes the poor performance of inbred strains to a high percentage of these harmful recessives. The overdominance hypothesis was developed independently by Edward M. East (1908) and George Shull (1908). Genetic variation at an overdominant locus is expected to be maintained by balancing selection. The high fitness of heterozygous genotypes favours the persistence of an allelic polymorphism in the population. This hypothesis is commonly invoked to explain the persistence of some alleles (most famously the Sickle cell trait allele) that are harmful in homozygotes. In normal circumstances, such harmful alleles would be removed from a population through the process of natural selection. Like the dominance hypothesis, it attributes the poor performance of inbred strains to expression of such harmful recessive alleles.

Dominance and overdominance have different consequences for the gene expression profile of the individuals. If overdominance is the main cause for the fitness advantages of heterosis, then there should be an over-expression of certain genes in the heterozygous offspring compared to the homozygous parents. On the other hand, if dominance is the cause, fewer genes should be under-expressed in the heterozygous offspring compared to the parents. Furthermore, for any given gene, the expression should be comparable to the one observed in the fitter of the two parents. In any case, outcross matings provide the benefit of masking deleterious recessive alleles in progeny. This benefit has been proposed to be a major factor in the maintenance of sexual reproduction among eukaryotes, as summarized in the article Evolution of sexual reproduction.

==== Historical retrospective ====
Which of the two mechanisms are the "main" reason for heterosis has been a scientific controversy in the field of genetics. Population geneticist James Crow (1916–2012) believed, in his younger days, that overdominance was a major contributor to hybrid vigor. In 1998 he published a retrospective review of the developing science. According to Crow, the demonstration of several cases of heterozygote advantage in Drosophila and other organisms first caused great enthusiasm for the overdominance theory among scientists studying plant hybridization. But overdominance implies that yields on an inbred strain should decrease as inbred strains are selected for the performance of their hybrid crosses, as the proportion of harmful recessives in the inbred population rises. Over the years, experimentation in plant genetics has proven that the reverse occurs, that yields increase in both the inbred strains and the hybrids, suggesting that dominance alone may be adequate to explain the superior yield of hybrids. Only a few conclusive cases of overdominance have been reported in all of genetics. Since the 1980s, as experimental evidence has mounted, the dominance theory has made a comeback.

Crow wrote:

The current view ... is that the dominance hypothesis is the major explanation of inbreeding decline and [of] the high yield of hybrids. There is little statistical evidence for contributions from overdominance and epistasis. But whether the best hybrids are getting an extra boost from overdominance or favorable epistatic contributions remains an open question.

=== Epigenetics ===
An epigenetic contribution to heterosis has been established in plants, and it has also been reported in animals. MicroRNAs (miRNAs), discovered in 1993, are a class of non-coding small RNAs which repress the translation of messenger RNAs (mRNAs) or cause degradation of mRNAs. In hybrid plants, most miRNAs have non-additive expression (it might be higher or lower than the levels in the parents). This suggests that the small RNAs are involved in the growth, vigor and adaptation of hybrids.

'Heterosis without hybridity' effects on plant size have been demonstrated in genetically isogenic F1 triploid (autopolyploid) plants, where paternal genome excess F1 triploids display positive heterosis, whereas maternal genome excess F1s display negative heterosis effects. Such findings demonstrate that heterosis effects, with a genome dosage-dependent epigenetic basis, can be generated in F1 offspring that are genetically isogenic (i.e. harbour no heterozygosity). It has been shown that hybrid vigor in an allopolyploid hybrid of two Arabidopsis species was due to epigenetic control in the upstream regions of two genes, which caused major downstream alteration in chlorophyll and starch accumulation. The mechanism involves acetylation or methylation of specific amino acids in histone H3, a protein closely associated with DNA, which can either activate or repress associated genes.

== Specific mechanisms ==
=== Major histocompatibility complex in animals ===
One example of where particular genes may be important in vertebrate animals for heterosis is the major histocompatibility complex (MHC). Vertebrates inherit several copies of both MHC class I and MHC class II from each parent, which are used in antigen presentation as part of the adaptive immune system. Each different copy of the genes is able to bind and present a different set of potential peptides to T-lymphocytes. These genes are highly polymorphic throughout populations, but are more similar in smaller, more closely related populations. Breeding between more genetically distant individuals decreases the chance of inheriting two alleles that are the same or similar, allowing a more diverse range of peptides to be presented. This, therefore, increases the chance that any particular pathogen will be recognised, and means that more antigenic proteins on any pathogen are likely to be recognised, giving a greater range of T-cell activation, so a greater response. This also means that the immunity acquired to the pathogen is against a greater range of antigens, meaning that the pathogen must mutate more before immunity is lost. Thus, hybrids are less likely to succumb to pathogenic disease and are more capable of fighting off infection. This may be the cause, though, of autoimmune diseases.

== Plants ==
Crosses between inbreds from different heterotic groups result in vigorous F1 hybrids with significantly more heterosis than F1 hybrids from inbreds within the same heterotic group or pattern. Heterotic groups are created by plant breeders to classify inbred lines, and can be progressively improved by reciprocal recurrent selection.

Heterosis is used to increase yields, uniformity, and vigor. Hybrid breeding methods are used in maize, sorghum, rice, sugar beet, onion, spinach, sunflowers, broccoli and to create a more psychoactive cannabis.

=== Corn (maize) ===
Nearly all field corn (maize) grown in most developed nations exhibits heterosis. Modern corn hybrids substantially outyield conventional cultivars and respond better to fertilizer.

Corn heterosis was famously demonstrated in the early 20th century by George H. Shull and Edward M. East after hybrid corn was invented by Dr. William James Beal of Michigan State University based on work begun in 1879 at the urging of Charles Darwin. Dr. Beal's work led to the first published account of a field experiment demonstrating hybrid vigor in corn, by Eugene Davenport and Perry Holden, 1881. These various pioneers of botany and related fields showed that crosses of inbred lines made from a Southern dent and a Northern flint, respectively, showed substantial heterosis and outyielded conventional cultivars of that era. However, at that time such hybrids could not be economically made on a large scale for use by farmers. Donald F. Jones at the Connecticut Agricultural Experiment Station, New Haven invented the first practical method of producing a high-yielding hybrid maize in 1914–1917. Jones' method produced a double-cross hybrid, which requires two crossing steps working from four distinct original inbred lines. Later work by corn breeders produced inbred lines with sufficient vigor for practical production of a commercial hybrid in a single step, the single-cross hybrids. Single-cross hybrids are made from just two original parent inbreds. They are generally more vigorous and also more uniform than the earlier double-cross hybrids. The process of creating these hybrids often involves detasseling.

Temperate maize hybrids are derived from two main heterotic groups: 'Iowa Stiff Stalk Synthetic', and nonstiff stalk.

=== Rice (Oryza sativa) ===
Hybrid rice sees cultivation in many countries, including China, India, Vietnam, and the Philippines. Compared to inbred lines, hybrids produce approximately 20% greater yield, and comprise 45% of rice planting area in China. Rice production has seen enormous rise in China due to heavy uses of hybrid rice. In China, efforts have generated a super hybrid rice strain ('LYP9') with a production capability around 15 tons per hectare. In India also, several varieties have shown high vigor, including 'RH-10' and 'Suruchi 5401'.

Since rice is a self-pollinating species, it requires the use of male-sterile lines to generate hybrids from separate lineages. The most common way of achieving this is using lines with genetic male-sterility, as manual emasculation is not optimal for large-scale hybridization. The first generation of hybrid rice was developed in the 1970s. It relies on three lines: a cytoplasmic male sterile (CMS) line, a maintainer line, and a restorer line. The second generation was widely adopted in the 1990s. Instead of a CMS line, it uses an environment-sensitive genic male sterile line (EGMS), which can have its sterility reversed based on light or temperature. This removes the need for a maintainer, making the hybridization and breeding process more efficient (albeit still high-maintenance). Second generation lines show a yield increase of 5-10% over first generation lines. The third and current generation uses a nuclear male sterile line (NMS). Third generation lines have a recessive sterility gene, and their cultivation is more lenient towards maintainer lines and environmental conditions. Additionally, transgenes are only present in the maintainer, so hybrid plants can benefit from hybrid vigor without requiring special oversight.

== Animals ==
=== Hybrid livestock ===
The concept of heterosis is also applied in the production of commercial livestock. In cattle, crosses between Black Angus and Hereford produce a cross known as a "Black Baldy". In swine, "blue butts" are produced by the cross of Hampshire and Yorkshire. Other, more exotic hybrids (two different species, so genetically more dissimilar), such as "beefalo" which are hybrids of cattle and bison, are also used for specialty markets.

==== Poultry ====
Within poultry, sex-linked genes have been used to create hybrids in which males and females can be sorted at one day old by color. Specific genes used for this are genes for barring and wing feather growth. Crosses of this sort create what are sold as Black Sex-links, Red Sex-links, and various other crosses that are known by trade names.

Commercial broilers are produced by crossing different strains of White Rocks and White Cornish, the Cornish providing a large frame and the Rocks providing the fast rate of gain. The hybrid vigor produced allows the production of uniform birds at a marketable carcass weight at 6–9 weeks of age.

Likewise, hybrids between different strains of White Leghorn are used to produce laying flocks that provide the majority of white eggs for sale in the United States.

=== Dogs ===
Mixed-breed dogs have, on average, longer lifespans than purebred dogs. Meta-analyses of well-conducted studies have found that first-generation hybrids of purebred dogs live the longest, strongly suggesting a hybrid vigor effect.

John Scott and John L. Fuller performed a detailed study of purebred Cocker Spaniels, purebred Basenjis, and hybrids between them. They found that hybrids ran faster than either parent, perhaps due to heterosis. Other characteristics, such as basal heart rate, did not show any heterosis—the dog's basal heart rate was close to the average of its parents—perhaps due to the additive effects of multiple genes.

Sometimes people working on a dog-breeding program find no useful heterosis.

=== Birds ===
In 2014, a study undertaken by the Centre for Integrative Ecology at Deakin University in Geelong, Victoria, concluded that intrasubspecific hybrids between the subspecies Platycercus elegans flaveolus and P. e. elegans of the crimson rosella (P. elegans) were more likely to fight off diseases than their pure counterparts.

=== Humans ===
Humans are genetically very similar to each other. Michael Mingroni has proposed heterosis, in the form of hybrid vigor associated with historical reductions of the levels of inbreeding, as an explanation of the Flynn effect, the steady rise in IQ test scores around the world during the 20th century. However, this hypothesis has been met with criticism. A review of nine studies found that there is no evidence to suggest inbreeding has an effect on IQ. However, recent, large-scale meta-analysis studies upon 72 countries have indicated a robust negative correlation (r value of −0.62) between IQ and consanguinity (i.e., inbreeding).

== Controversy ==
The term heterosis often causes confusion and even controversy, particularly in selective breeding of domestic animals, because it is sometimes (incorrectly) claimed that all crossbred plants and animals are "genetically superior" to their parents, due to heterosis, but two problems exist with this claim:

1. according to an article published in the journal Genome Biology, "genetic superiority" is an ill-defined term and not generally accepted terminology within the scientific field of genetics. A related term fitness is well defined, but it can rarely be directly measured. Instead, scientists use objective, measurable quantities, such as the number of seeds a plant produces, the germination rate of a seed, or the percentage of organisms that survive to reproductive age. From this perspective, crossbred plants and animals exhibiting heterosis may have "superior" traits, but this does not necessarily equate to any evidence of outright "genetic superiority". Use of the term "superiority" is commonplace for example in crop breeding, where it is well understood to mean a better-yielding, more robust plant for agriculture. Such a plant may yield better on a farm, but would likely struggle to survive in the wild, making this use open to misinterpretation. In human genetics any question of "genetic superiority" is even more problematic due to the historical and political implications of any such claim. Some may even go as far as to describe it as a questionable value judgement in the realm of politics, not science.
2. not all hybrids exhibit heterosis (see outbreeding depression).

An example of the ambiguous value judgements imposed on hybrids and hybrid vigor is the mule. While mules are almost always infertile, they are valued for a combination of hardiness and temperament that is different from either of their horse or donkey parents. While these qualities may make them "superior" for particular uses by humans, the infertility issue implies that these animals would most likely become extinct without the intervention of humans through animal husbandry, making them "inferior" in terms of natural selection.

== See also ==
- F1 hybrid
- Genetic admixture
- Heterozygote advantage
- Outbreeding depression
