= Blaarkop =

Dutch breed of dairy cattle

Groninger Blaarkop
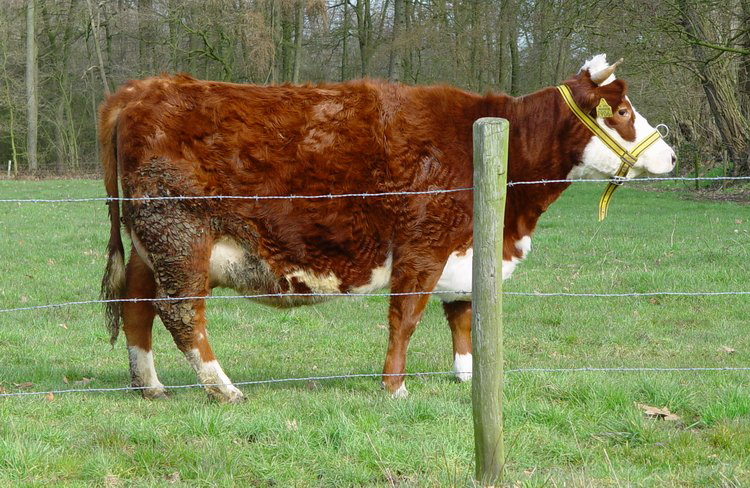
- Conservation status: FAO (2007): endangered; DAD-IS (2024): endangered maintained; SZH (2024): endangered
- Other names: Blaarkop
- Country of origin: Netherlands
- Use: dual-purpose, milk and meat

Traits
- Coat: black-and-white, red-and-white
- Cattle; Bos (primigenius) taurus

The Blaarkop or Groninger Blaarkop is a Dutch breed of dual-purpose cattle. Blaarkop is Dutch for blister head. Its main breeding area is in the province of Groningen.

== History ==
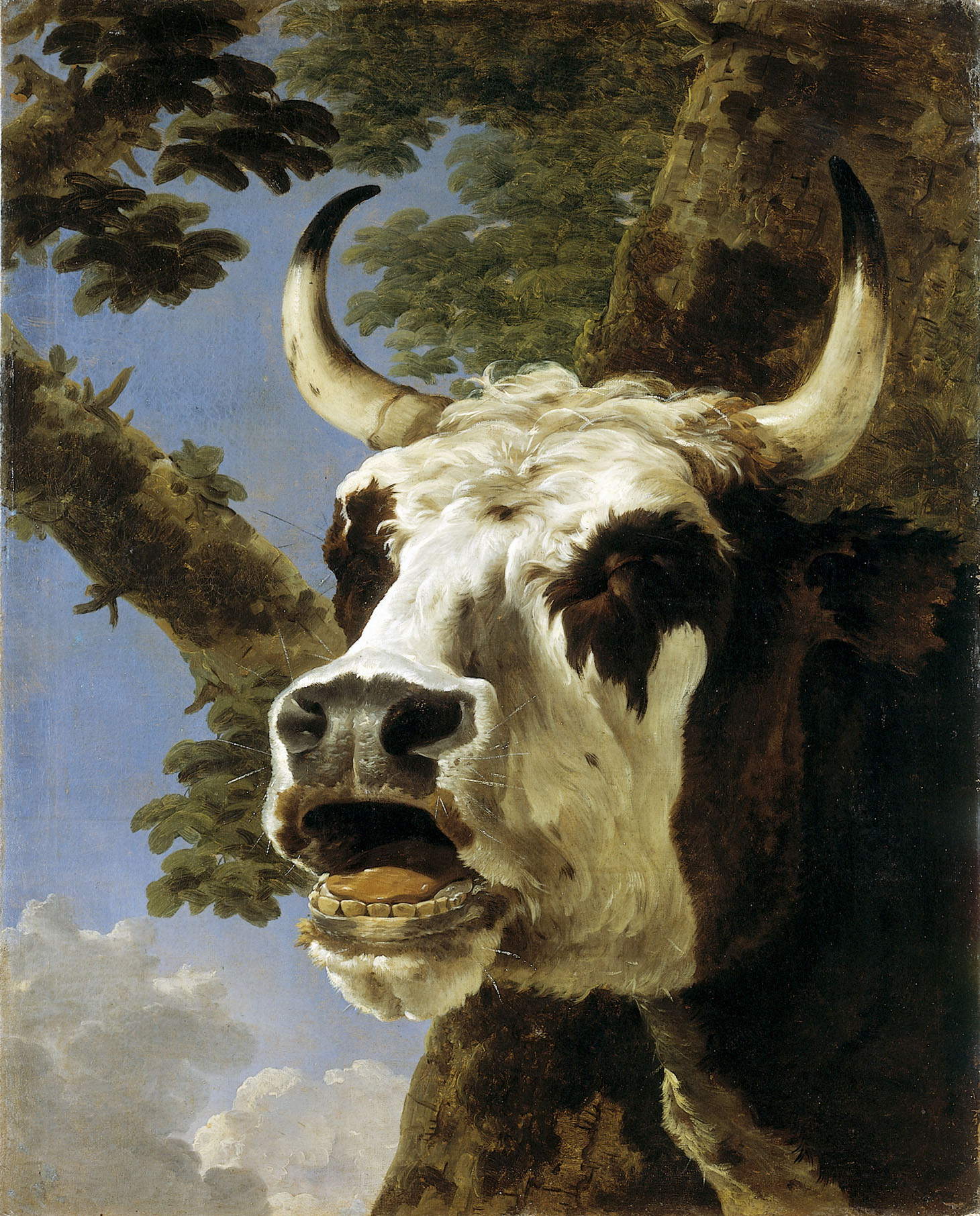
Head of a Bellowing Ox, painting by Jan Asselijn, early seventeenth century

White-headed cattle in Holland have been mentioned as early as the fourteenth century. Cattle showing some similarity to the modern Blaarkop appear in an Adoration by Pieter Aertsen dating from about 1560, and in a seventeenth-century Head of a Bellowing Ox by Jan Asselijn. From the nineteenth century, there are also Blaarkoppen in the Utrecht and Leiden regions.

Bulls of this type were among the cattle shipped to the Cape of Good Hope by Willem Adriaan van der Stel during his time as governor of the Cape Colony (1699–1707).

De Blaarkopstichting, a non-profit foundation for the development and conservation of the Blairkop, was established in 2002.

== Characteristics ==
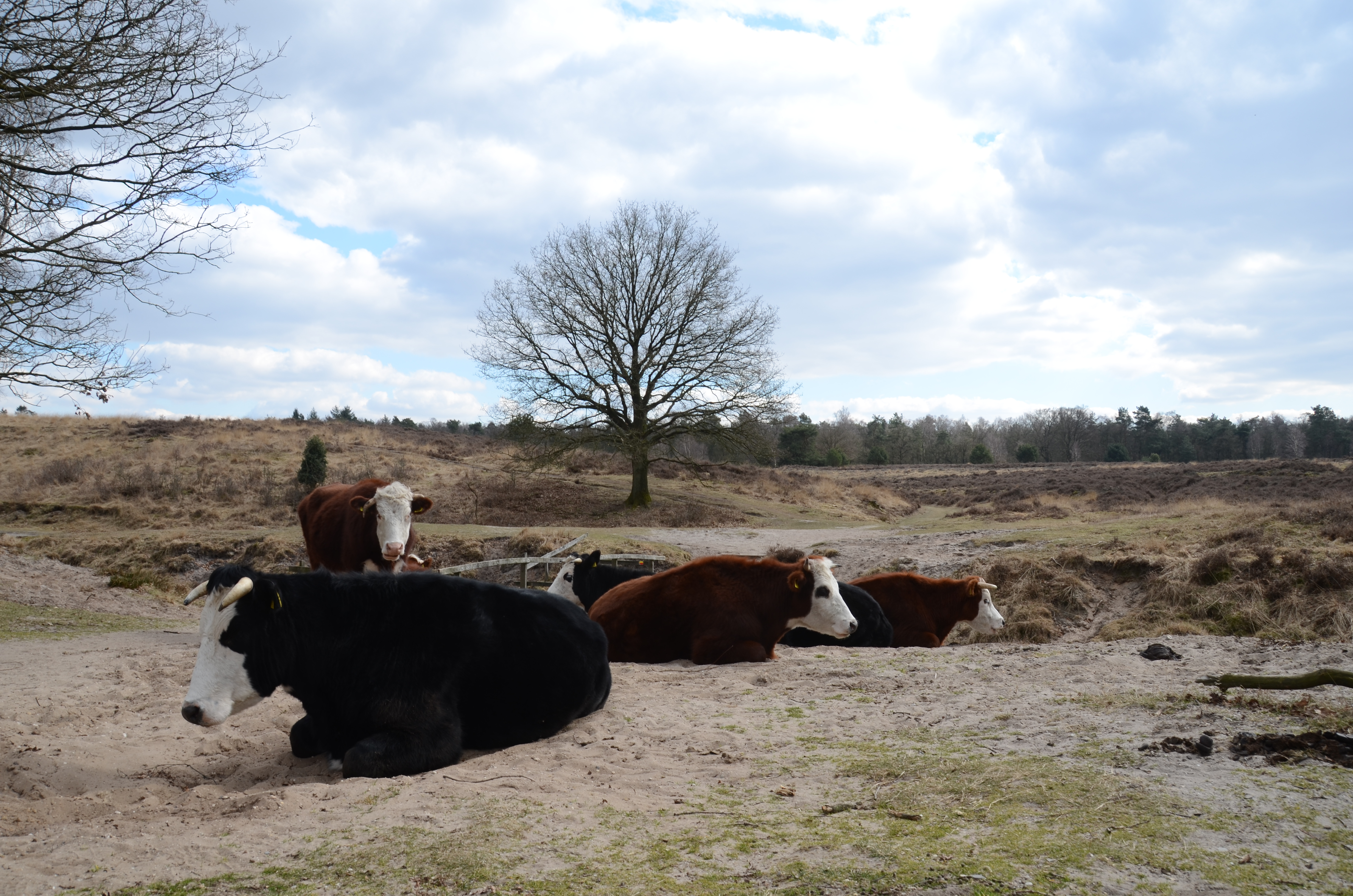
Used for vegetation management near Doorwerth, in Gelderland

The Blaarkop breed is sturdily built with matching muscles, a horned head, and strong legs. Both red (60% of the population) and black (40%) Blaarkoppen exist. The body is solid red or black, while the head is white with a red or black ring (blister) around the eyes; the tail has a white tip.

Bulls are 1.45 to 1.50 metres (4 ft 9 in to 4 ft 11 in) high and weigh 800 kilograms (1,800 lb). Cows are 1.35 to 1.40 metres (4 ft 5 in to 4 ft 7 in) high and weigh 600 kilograms (1,300 lb).

== Use ==
The average milk yield is 6166 kg in a lactation of 315 days, with 4.38% fat and 3.57% protein; many cows give more than 7000 kg, and yields above 9000 kg can occur.
