= Black Baldy =

Cattle cross-breed

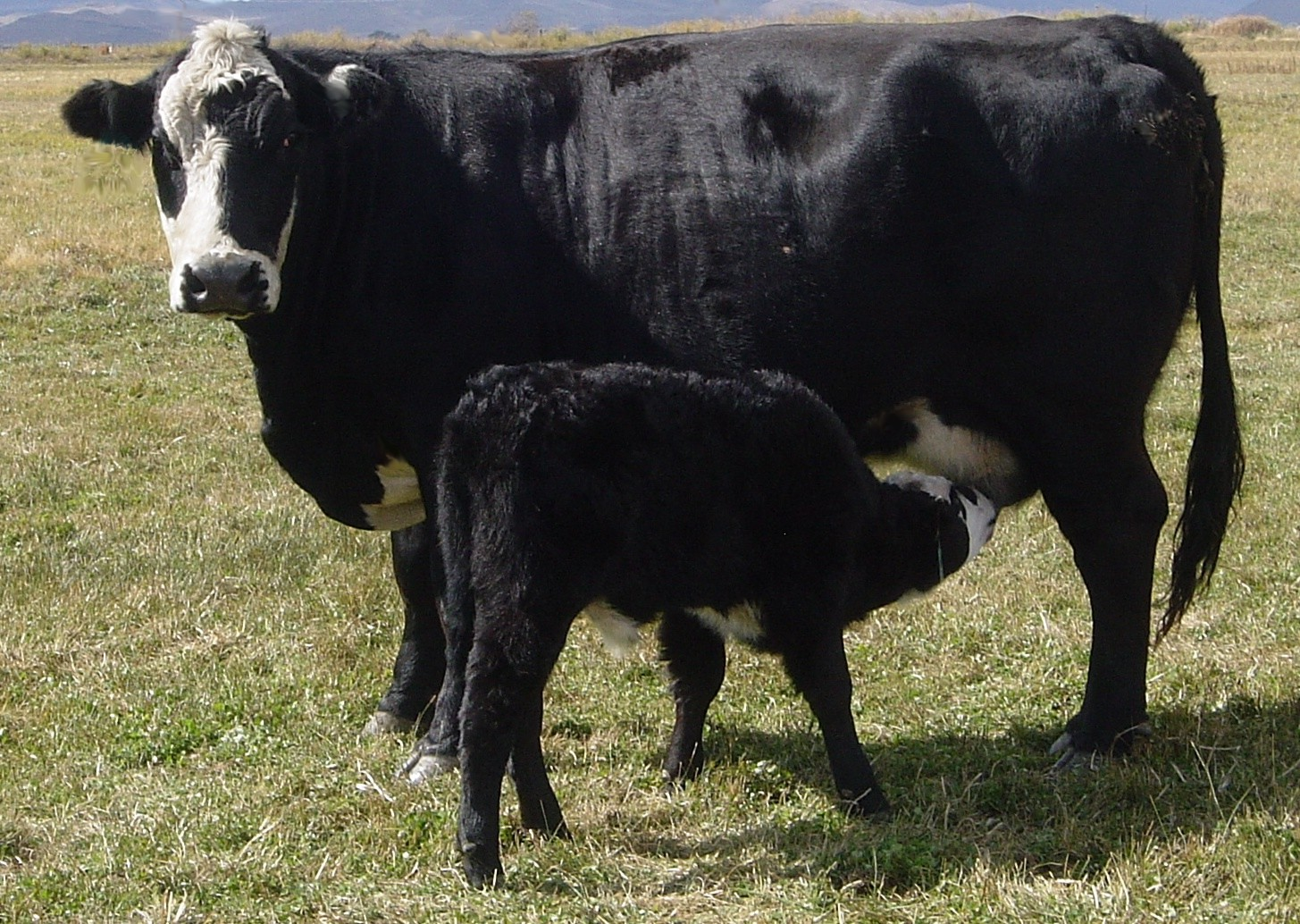
Cow and calf

The Black Baldy is a cross-bred type of beef cattle. It is traditionally produced by crossing Hereford bulls on Aberdeen Angus cows. These cattle are commonly reared in Australia and New Zealand.

== Characteristics ==
The Black Baldy is traditionally produced by crossing Hereford bulls on Aberdeen Angus cows. The reverse cross, of Angus bulls on Hereford heifers, may also be employed in an attempt to produce smaller calves and thus reduce dystocia during birth.

The first-generation (F1) calves from this cross uniformly exhibit the three principal dominant traits of the parent breeds – the polled (hornless) characteristic and the black coat of the Angus, and the white face of the Hereford. Black Baldy calves may exhibit some degree of heterosis (hybrid vigour), and may be healthier and faster-growing than comparable purebred stock. Black Baldy cows may reach sexual maturity sooner and have higher fertility than cows of the parent breeds; they may also remain healthier, have better maternal qualities, and have a longer productive life.

If first-generation Black Baldies are then bred together, the characteristics of the resulting second-generation (F2) calves are highly variable: in gross morphology they may be – in roughly equal proportions – either red or black, either horned or polled, and either white-faced or solid-coloured, resulting in a total of eight possible combinations.

== Use ==
The Black Baldy is reared for beef. Cows may be mated to a bull of a European beef breed, to produce a heavier, better-muscled and faster-growing calf.

The American Black Hereford was developed in the United States in the 1990s by crossing Black Baldy cows to Hereford bulls, and then selecting for black coat colour.
