= Certation =

In botany, certation is competition in the style between pollen tubes attempting to fertilise the ovules there. If different pollen genotypes have different success rates then the genotype frequencies of the fertilised seeds will deviate from that which would occur if all pollen was equally successful. This process has been proposed to explain female-biased sex ratios in some dioecious plants, if female-determining pollen (which causes seeds to be female) is more successful than male-determining pollen (which causes seeds to be male), though other mechanisms whereby the sex ratio may be skewed away from 50:50 are also known.
