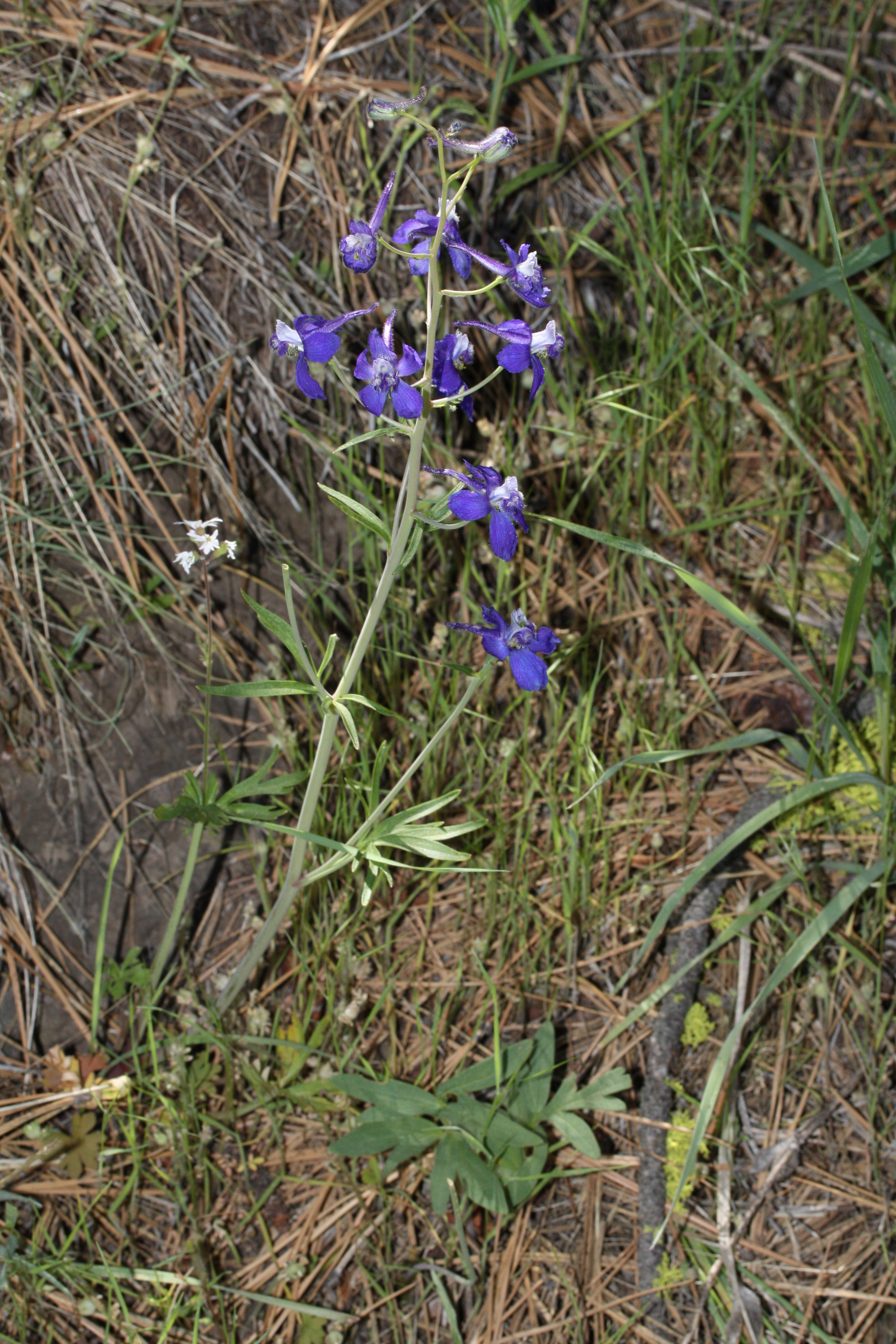
- Delphinium nuttallianum in Wenas Wildlife Area

Scientific classification
- Kingdom: Plantae
- Clade: Tracheophytes
- Clade: Angiosperms
- Clade: Eudicots
- Order: Ranunculales
- Family: Ranunculaceae
- Genus: Delphinium
- Species: D. nuttallianum

Binomial name
- Delphinium nuttallianum Pritz. ex Walp.

Synonyms
- Delphinium nelsonii; D. sonnei

= Delphinium nuttallianum =

Species of flowering plant

Delphinium nuttallianum is a species of larkspur known by the common names two-lobe larkspur, upland larkspur, common larkspur, and Nuttall's larkspur (the latter name is shared with Delphinium nuttallii). It is widely distributed across western North America from California to Alberta, including mountain meadows and the majority of the sagebrush steppe, except very dry areas.

The roots vary from thin to thick. The plant has a white to pink erect stem usually not exceeding half a meter in height, which may branch several times. Deeply lobed leaves are located mostly about the base of the plant. The inflorescence occupying the top end of the stem has a few widely spaced flowers on long pedicels. The sepals are long and curl backwards or fold upon themselves. They may be purple to blue or almost white. The lower petals are the same color, while the upper are often white. The spur is one or two centimeters long. The upper portion of the plant is often hairy.

The species is very poisonous to livestock, especially cattle.
