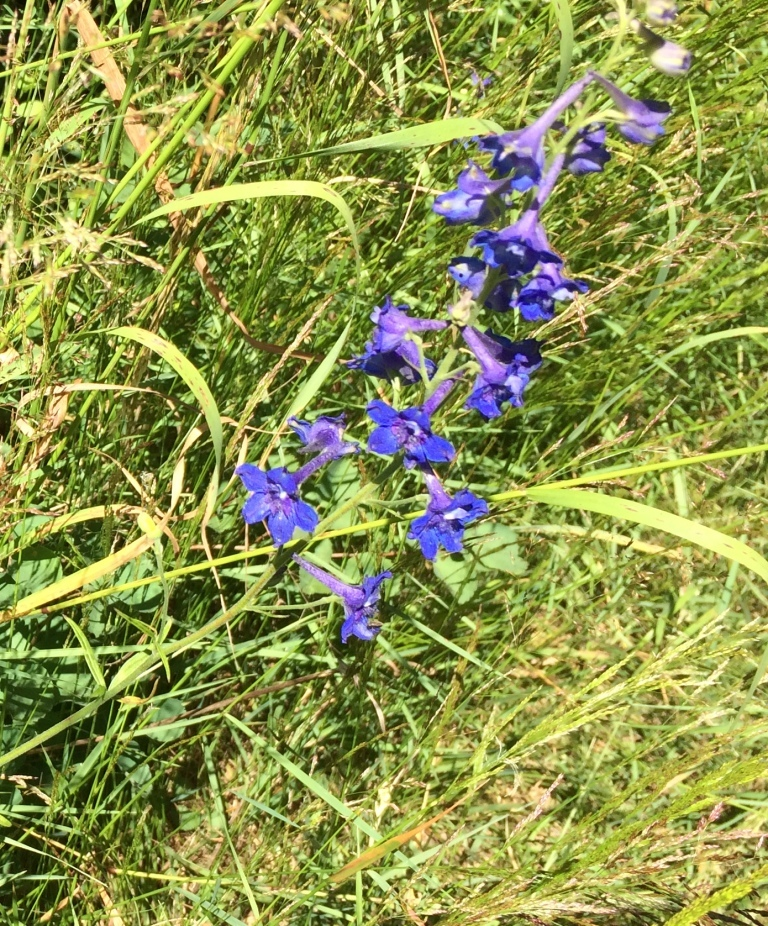

Scientific classification
- Kingdom: Plantae
- Clade: Tracheophytes
- Clade: Angiosperms
- Clade: Eudicots
- Order: Ranunculales
- Family: Ranunculaceae
- Genus: Delphinium
- Species: D. nuttallii

Binomial name
- Delphinium nuttallii A.Gray

Synonyms
- Delphinium columbianum Greene; Delphinium exaltatum var. nuttallii (A.Gray) Huth

= Delphinium nuttallii =

Species of flowering plant

Delphinium nuttallii is a species of Delphinium native to Washington and Oregon (the Columbia River Gorge) of the western United States. Its common names include Nuttall's larkspur and Columbia larkspur.

== Taxonomy ==
Delphinium nuttallii was first described by Asa Gray in the Botanical Gazette 12(3): 54, in 1887. Nuttallii was named in honor of Thomas Nuttall, an English botanist.

== Description ==
The erect divided stems are covered in fine upward curving hairs. The erect leaves are either 2 to 3 inches long and divided nearly to the center. The 3 lobes are each divided into even smaller lobes. The sticky inflorescence has many single flowers on a spike with stalks that are 1 inch long or shorter. The flowers are 5 light to deep blue sepals, a long slender light blue spur, 2 upper pale blue notched petals, and 2 bright blue petals to the sides. It can be confused with Delphinium nuttallianum, who is also named after Thomas Nuttall, but D. nuttallianum is a lot shorter.

== Distribution ==
It is found in many counties in Washington and Oregon. In Washington state, it is found in Cowlitz, Clark, Skamania, Klickitat, and Benton counties in the south of the state, and in Grays Harbor, Mason, Thurston, and Pierce counties in the central-west. In Oregon state, it is found in Douglas, Josephine, Jackson, Klamath, Lake, Harney, Malheur, Crook, Grant, Umatilla, Union, and Wallowa counties in the south and east of the state, and Columbia, Multnomah, Clackamas, Yamhill, Hood River, and Wasco counties in the north west of the state.
