= Outcrossing =

Technique of crossing between different breeds

Out-crossing or out-breeding is the technique of crossing between different breeds. This is the practice of introducing distantly related genetic material into a breeding line, thereby increasing genetic diversity.

== Outcrossing in animals ==
Outcrossing can be a useful technique in animal breeding. The outcrossing breeder intends to remove the traits by using "new blood." With dominant traits, one can still see the expression of the traits and can remove those traits, whether one outcrosses, line breeds or inbreeds. With recessive traits, outcrossing allows for the recessive traits to migrate across a population. Many traits are Mendelian and therefore exhibit a more complicated intermediate phenotype. The outcrossing breeder then may have individuals that have many deleterious genes that may be expressed by subsequent inbreeding. There is now a gamut of deleterious genes within each individual in many dog breeds.

Increasing the variation of genes or alleles within the gene pool may protect against extinction by stressors from the environment among inbred animal populations. For example, in this context, a 2009 veterinary medicine study tried to determine the genetic diversity within cat breeds.

A degree of outcrossing to avoid mating between very close relatives is believed to happen in the wild.

== Outcrossing in plants ==
In plants, outcrossing can promote genetic diversity, introduce new traits, and result in masking of deleterious mutations in progeny. The masking effect of outcrossing is known as genetic complementation, an effect recognized as a factor in hybrid vigor or heterosis, where the offspring of a hybrid cross perform better and have higher biomass and yield than either parent.

Once outcrossing is established in a lineage of flowering plants, subsequent inbreeding can be disadvantageous because it allows expression of the previously masked deleterious recessive mutations, i.e. inbreeding depression. However, transitions from outcrossing to self-pollination do occur in wild plants. Outcrossing is usually enforced by self-incompatibility.

== Outcrossing in fungi ==
Outcrossing in fungi involves syngamy between haploid cells produced by separate diploid individuals.

Life-history traits are said to increase the probability of outcrossing in fungi, such as long-distance dispersal and persistence of the haploid stage. Some studies even show that fungi favor outcrossing in comparison to other mating types. In a study performed with the commercial button mushroom, Agaricus bisporus, outcrossed populations of the fungi showed higher fitness than inbred ones in several fitness components.

== General practice ==
Breeders inbreed within their genetic pool, attempting to maintain desirable traits and to cull those traits that are undesirable. When undesirable traits begin to appear, mates are selected to determine if a trait is recessive or dominant. Removal of the trait is accomplished by breeding two individuals known not to carry it.

Gregor Mendel used outcrossing in his experiments with flowers. He then used the resulting offspring to chart inheritance patterns, using the crossing of siblings, and backcrossing to parents to determine how inheritance functioned.

== Darwin's perspective ==
Charles Darwin, in his book The Effects of Cross and Self-Fertilization in the Vegetable Kingdom,. stated regarding outcrossing that "the offspring from the union of two distinct individuals, especially if their progenitors have been subjected to very different conditions, have an immense advantage in height, weight, constitutional vigor and fertility over the self-fertilizing offspring from either one of the same parents". He thought that this observation was amply sufficient to account for outcrossing sexual reproduction. The disadvantages of self-fertilized offspring (inbreeding depression) are now thought to be largely due to the homozygous expression of deleterious recessive mutations; and the fitness advantages of some outcrossed offspring are thought to be largely due to the heterozygous masking of such deleterious mutations except when such mutations lead to outbreeding depression.

== See also ==
- Consanguinity
- Heterosis
- Outbreeding depression
