= Phenotypic screening =

Type of medical testing in drug discovery

Phenotypic screening is a type of screening used in biological research and drug discovery to identify substances such as small molecules, peptides, or RNAi that alter the phenotype of a cell or an organism in a desired manner. Phenotypic screening must be followed up with identification (sometimes referred to as target deconvolution) and validation, often through the use of chemoproteomics, to identify the mechanisms through which a phenotypic hit works.

== Historical context ==
Phenotypic screening historically has been the basis for the discovery of new drugs. Compounds are screened in cellular or animal disease models to identify compounds that cause a desirable change in phenotype. Only after the compounds have been discovered are efforts made to determine the biological targets of the compounds - a process known as target deconvolution. This overall strategy is referred to as "classical pharmacology", "forward pharmacology" or "phenotypic drug discovery" (PDD).

More recently it has become popular to develop a hypothesis that a certain biological target is disease modifying, and then screen for compounds that modulate the activity of this purified target. Afterwards, these compounds are tested in animals to see if they have the desired effect. This approach is known as "reverse pharmacology" or "target based drug discovery" (TDD). However recent statistical analysis reveals that a disproportionate number of first-in-class drugs with novel mechanisms of action come from phenotypic screening which has led to a resurgence of interest in this method.

== Types ==
=== In vitro ===
The simplest phenotypic screens employ cell lines and monitor a single parameter such as cellular death or the production of a particular protein. High-content screening where changes in the expression of several proteins can be simultaneously monitored is also often used. High-content imaging of dye-labeled cellular components can also reveal effects of compounds on cell cultures in vitro, distinguishing the phenotypic effects of a broad variety of drugs.

=== In vivo ===
In whole animal-based approaches, phenotypic screening is best exemplified where a substance is evaluated for potential therapeutic benefit across many different types of animal models representing different disease states. Phenotypic screening in animal-based systems utilize model organisms to evaluate the effects of a test agent in fully assembled biological systems. Example organisms used for high-content screening include the fruit fly (Drosophila melanogaster), zebrafish (Danio rerio) and mice (Mus musculus). In some instances the term phenotypic screening is used to include the serendipitous findings that occur in clinical trial settings particularly when new and unanticipated therapeutic effects of a therapeutic candidate are uncovered.

Screening in model organism offers the advantage of interrogating test agents, or alterations in targets of interest, in the context of fully integrated, assembled, biological systems, providing insights that could otherwise not be obtained in cellular systems. Some have argued that cellular based systems are unable to adequately model human disease processes that involve many different cell types across many different organ systems and that this type of complexity can only be emulated in model organisms. The productivity of drug discovery by phenotypic screening in organisms, including serendipitous findings in the clinic, are consistent with this notion.

== Use in drug repositioning ==
Animal based approaches to phenotypic screening are not as amenable to screening libraries containing thousands of small molecules. Therefore, these approaches have found more utility in evaluating already approved drugs or late stage drug candidates for drug repositioning.

A number of companies, including Melior Discovery,. Many other companies are involved in phenotypic screening research approaches, including Eurofins Discovery Phenotypic Services, Evotec, Dharmacon, Inc., ThermoScientific, and Persomics.

== Collaborative research ==
The pharmaceutical company Eli Lilly has formalized collaborative efforts with various 3rd parties aimed at conducting phenotypic screening of selected small molecules.
