= Anastasia Khvorova =

American RNA biochemist

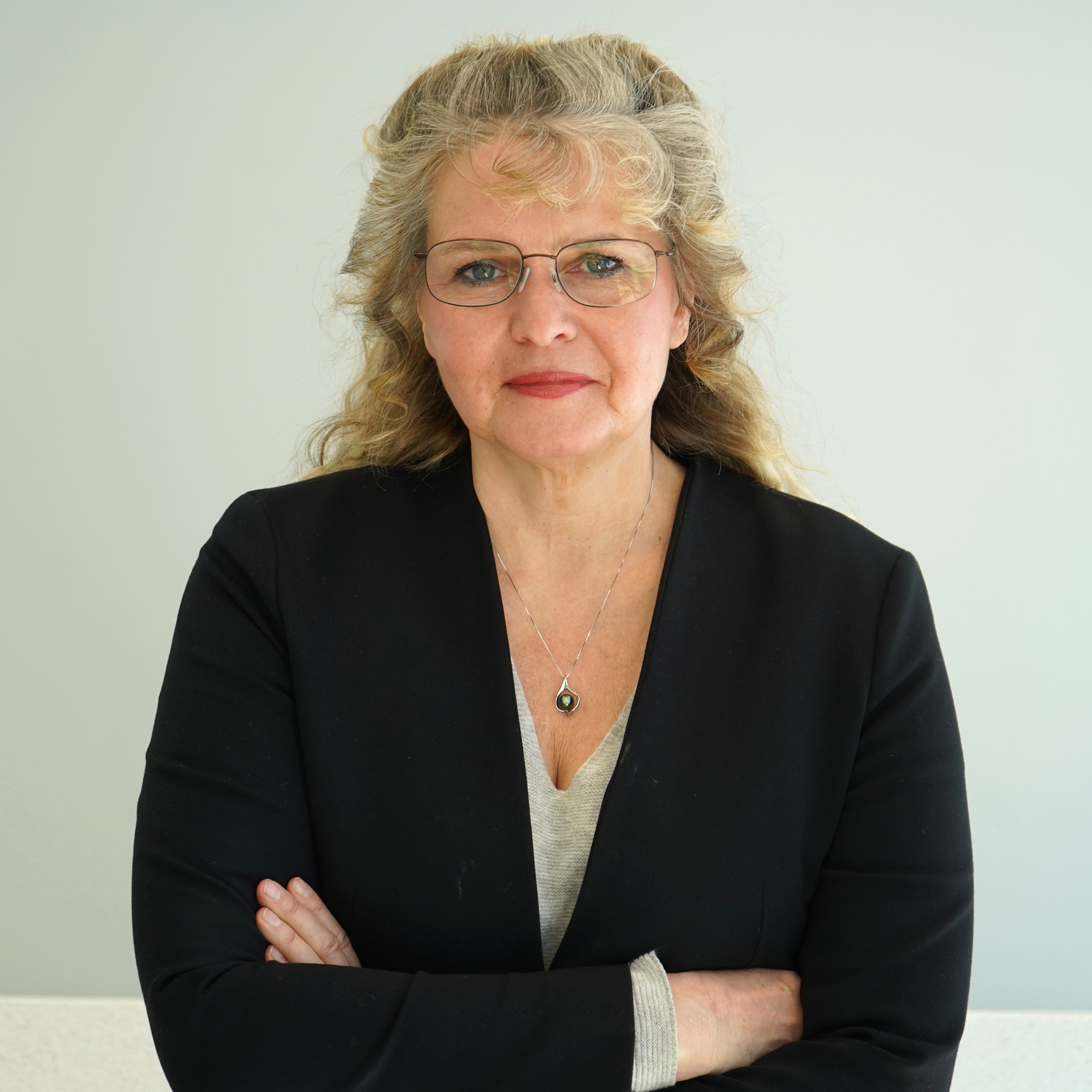
- Born: Moscow, Russia
- Education: Russian Academy of Sciences, PhD (1994); Moscow State University, BS/MS (1991)
- Known for: Chemical engineering of siRNAs
- Scientific career
- Fields: Nucleic acid chemistry, biochemistry, molecular biology
- Workplaces: UMass Chan Medical School; RXi Pharmaceuticals; Thermo Fisher Scientific (formerly Dharmacon); Amgen
- Website: https://www.umassmed.edu/khvorovalab/

Anastasia Khvorova (born August 3, 1969) is a Russian-born American biochemist, academic, and biotechnology executive. She is a professor at the University of Massachusetts Chan Medical School, where she holds the Remondi Family Chair in Biomedical Sciences. Khvorova is a researcher within the RNA Therapeutics Institute (RTI) and the Program in Molecular Medicine, specializing in the chemical engineering and development of oligonucleotide therapeutics and RNA interference (RNAi) technologies.

== Early life and education ==
Khvorova was born in Moscow, USSR. She attended the Russian Academy of Sciences, earning her PhD in biochemistry in 1994. Following her graduate studies, she immigrated to the United States in 1995 to complete postdoctoral training in RNA biology at the University of Colorado Boulder.

== Career ==
For 12 years, Khvorova held several different executive positions within the biotechnology industry, focusing on the commercial translation of RNA chemistry. During this time, she also co-founded many different biotechnology companies. She worked as a research scientist at Amgen before moving to Dharmacon, then a division of Thermo Fisher Scientific, where she was involved in RNA biology and chemistry initiatives and eventually served as Chief Scientific Officer. She later transitioned to RXi Pharmaceuticals, where she also held the role of Chief Scientific Officer.

After these 12 years, in December 2012, Khvorova joined as the faculty at the UMass Chan Medical School. Within the RNA Therapeutics Institute (RTI), she established the Nucleic Acid Chemistry Center.

As a professor in the RNA Therapeutics Institute, Khvorova and her lab work to develop new approaches to understand RNA delivery and trafficking. She has previously held a director position in the Oligonucleotide Therapeutics Society, as well as a director and council chair of the American Society of Gene and Cell Therapy.

== Research ==
=== Chemical modification and siRNA design ===
A theme of Khvorova's work is the study of chemical modifications to small interfering RNAs (siRNAs). Her laboratory has examined how alterations to ribose sugars, internucleotide linkages, and terminal groups affect RNA-induced silencing complex (RISC) loading, and gene-silencing activity. This work contributed to the development of modified siRNA scaffolds that retain RNAi potency, while exhibiting improved metabolic stability and reduced off-target effects.

Her studies, in collaboration with Phillip D. Zamore, helped define principles of thermodynamic asymmetry and strand selection during RISC assembly, clarifying how siRNA duplex design influences guide strand incorporation and silencing efficiency.

=== Extrahepatic delivery of RNA therapeutics ===
Khvorova has made contributions to strategies for delivering RNAi therapeutics beyond the liver. Her laboratory demonstrated that extensive chemical stabilization is required for effective conjugate-mediated delivery and identified lipid and other hydrophobic conjugates that enable functional RNAi activity in extrahepatic tissues.

=== Backbone chemistry and allele-selective silencing ===
Khvorova's research has also explored novel backbone chemistry, designed to enhance tissue retention and specificity. Her group characterized extended nucleic acid (exNA) and internally-constrained vinyl phosphonate linkages.

=== Multivalent and divalent siRNA architectures ===
More recently, Khvorova used multivalent and divalent siRNA architectures in which increased molecular valency, combined with optimized chemical modification, produces tissue retention and sustained gene silencing following a single administration. These designs have been applied to extrahepatic targets.

=== Off-target effects and RNA specificity ===
In parallel with applied therapeutic research, Khvorova has contributed to the understanding of off-target effects in RNAi. Her work demonstrated that seed-mediated interactions are a primary driver of miRNA-like off-target silencing.

=== Contributions to RNA therapeutics ===
Khvorova's has utilised siRNAs to selectively silence cells inflicted with Huntington's disease, within the mouse brain and within cells of patients with Huntington's disease.

== Involvement with biotechnology ==
Khvorova co-founded Atalanta Therapeutics, which develops RNA-based approaches for neurodegenerative diseases using branched siRNA technology licensed from UMass Chan Medical School, as well as Comanche Biopharma, which develops RNA-based therapeutics for preeclampsia based on work done by Anastasia Khvorova and Melissa J. Moore.

== Honors and awards ==
- Else Kröner Fresenius Prize for Medical Research (2025)
- Paper of the Year Award, Basic Research, Oligonucleotide Therapeutics Society Award for Extended Nucleic Acid (exNA): A Novel Platform Technology Development for Enhancing siRNA Potency in Vivo
- Special Award in Science for best paper of the year in Nucleic Acid Therapeutics, Rosalind Franklin Society (2023)
- Fellow, National Academy of Inventors (2022)

1. Yamada K, Vignesh N. Hariharan VN, Jillian Caiazzi J, Miller R, Ferguson CM, Sapp E, Fakih HH, Tang Q, Nozomi Yamada N, Furgal RC, Paquette JD, Biscans A, Bramato BM, McHugh N, Summers A, Lochmann C, Hildebrand S, Jackson SO, Hassler MR, Alterman JF, and Khvorova A. Enhancing siRNA efficacy in vivo with extended nucleic acid backbones. Nat Biotech. Aug 1; (2024). PubMedPMID: 39090305
2. Hariharan VN, Shin M, Chang CW, O'Reilly D, Biscans A, Yamada K, Guo Z, Somasundaran M, Tang Q, Monopoli K, Krishnamurthy PM, Devi G, McHugh N, Cooper DA, Echeverria D, Cruz J, Chan IL, Liu P, Lim SY, McConnell J, Singh SP, Hildebrand S, Sousa J, Davis SM, Kennedy Z, Ferguson C, Godinho BMDC, Thillier Y, Caiazzi J, Ly S, Muhuri M, Kelly K, Humphries F, Cousineau A, Parsi KM, Li Q, Wang Y, Maehr R, Gao G, Korkin D, McDougall WM, Finberg RW, Fitzgerald KA, Wang JP, Watts JK, Khvorova A. Divalent siRNAs are bioavailable in the lung and efficiently block SARS-CoV-2 infection. Proc Natl Acad Sci U S A. 120(11): e2219523120 (2023). PubMed Central PMCID: PMC10089225.
3. Conroy F, Miller R, Alterman JF, Hassler MR, Echeverria D, Godinho BMDC, Knox EG, Sapp E, Sousa J, Yamada K, Mahmood F, Boudi A, Kegel-Gleason K, DiFiglia M, Aronin N, Khvorova A, Pfister EL. Chemical engineering of therapeutic siRNAs for allele-specific gene silencing in Huntington's disease models. Nat Commun. 13(1): 5802 (2022).
4. Alterman JF, Godinho BMDC, Hassler MR, Ferguson CM, Echeverria D, Sapp E, Haraszti RA, Coles AH, Conroy F, Miller R, Roux L, Yan P, Knox EG, Turanov AA, King RM, Gernoux G, Mueller C, Gray-Edwards HL, Moser RP, Bishop NC, Jaber SM, Gounis MJ, Sena-Esteves M, Pai AA, DiFiglia M, Aronin N, Khvorova A. A divalent siRNA chemical scaffold for potent and sustained modulation of gene expression throughout the central nervous system. Nat Biotechnol. 37(8): 884–894 (2019).
5. Turanov AA, Lo A, Hassler MR, Makris A, Ashar-Patel A, Alterman JF, Coles AH, Haraszti RA, Roux L, Godinho BMDC, Echeverria D, Pears S, Iliopoulos J, Shanmugalingam R, Ogle R, Zsengeller ZK, Hennessy A, Karumanchi SA, Moore MJ, Khvorova A. RNAi modulation of placental sFLT1 for the treatment of preeclampsia. Nat Biotechnol. Nov 19; (2018).
6. Osborn MF, Coles AH, Golebiowski D, Echeverria D, Moazami MP, Watts JK, Sena-Esteves M, Khvorova A. Efficient Gene Silencing in Brain Tumors with Hydrophobically Modified siRNAs. Mol Cancer Ther. 17(6): 1251–1258 (2018).
7. Ly S, Navaroli DM, Didiot MC, Cardia J, Pandarinathan L, Alterman JF, Fogarty K, Standley C, Lifshitz LM, Bellve KD, Prot M, Echeverria D, Corvera S, Khvorova A. Visualization of self-delivering hydrophobically modified siRNA cellular internalization. Nucleic Acids Res. 45(1): 15–25 (2017).
8. Didiot MC, Hall LM, Coles AH, Haraszti RA, Godinho BM, Chase K, Sapp E, Ly S, Alterman JF, Hassler MR, Echeverria D, Raj L, Morrissey DV, DiFiglia M, Aronin N, Khvorova A. Exosome-mediated Delivery of Hydrophobically Modified siRNA for Huntingtin mRNA Silencing. Mol Ther. (10):1836–1847 (2016).
9. Birmingham A, Anderson E, Sullivan K, Reynolds A, Boese Q, Leake D, Karpilow J, Khvorova A. A protocol for designing siRNAs with high functionality and specificity. Nature Protocols. 2(9): 2068–78 (2007).
10. Khvorova A, Reynolds A, Jayasena SD. Functional siRNAs and miRNAs exhibit strand bias. Cell. 115(2): 209–16 (2003).
