= Persomics =

Multinational Life science company

- Company type: Private
- Industry: Drug discovery
- Founder: Neil Emans
- Website: www.persomics.com

Persomics is a private life science company specializing in genetic research, with locations in Boston, MA, Cupertino, CA, and Gothenburg, Sweden. The company’s aim is to simplify and expedite the process of discovering the basis of disease, and it has established a particular phenotypic screening kit that it uses for this purpose. These kits facilitate the interrogation of thousands of genes in parallel, and therefore pertain to human genome, pharmaceutical and disease model research.

== Technology ==
By 2013 the drug discovery market had begun shifting from the single to the multi-target paradigm, of which Persomics’ technology is a part. Prior to that time, popular drug discovery efforts focused on identifying single drugs that fit into specific cellular targets; this came to be known as target-based screening (i.e. reverse pharmacology). The multi-target approach entails the understanding that, although one drug compound might fit into a single target, diseases are associated with complex biological processes, and often multiple cellular targets, which are more difficult to unlock. Today phenotypic screening is enjoying a significant resurgence as part of the portfolio of drug discovery strategies leveraged at most companies. This is because phenotypic screening products (such as those offered by Persomics) offer a potentially revolutionary approach to discerning multiple cellular targets as the basis for genetic disease.

Phenotypic screening can lead to the identification of a molecule that modifies an organism or disease phenotype; it does this by acting on a previously unknown target or by acting simultaneously on more than one target. Phenotypic screening is therefore a method utilized in perceiving gene expression. This is of importance to human health because eukaryotic cells (e.g. human cells) have many sophisticated ways of controlling gene expression. One of those ways is through the agency of siRNAs. By directing gene silencing, siRNAs act as RNA interference, effectively inhibiting the expression of a gene in question. Since the time that the human genome was sequenced, the siRNAs correlating to each gene have been synthesized by various companies. The use of siRNAs therefore facilitates research into the human genome by allowing for selective suppression of specific genes of interest. Persomics produces a ready-made experiment kit in which any of these siRNAs can be contained. The kit contains the company’s plates, which can hold approximately 3,000 spots of sub-millimeter-sized siRNAs; these can be specified by the researcher requesting the kit. The experiment allows investigators to conduct multiple experiments (up to 3,000 per plate) of different libraries. A researcher is therefore able to discern and validate several things: the ways in which genes are regulated, the specific mechanisms of biological signaling pathways, and the multiple cellular targets, and various genes manipulated as a result of the disease. The approach used by the company is a variation in the efficiency and scale of phenotypic screening.

== Applications ==
There are several multi-target approaches to drug discovery, among them that are used by Persomics. Multi-target alternatives to Persomics’ technology include drug repositioning, polypharmacy, high-throughput screening and chemogenomics. While these research approaches have proved effective in helping scientists learn more about the human genome, the majority of the genome is still not understood. This is because approaches pertaining to phenotypic screening have traditionally been expensive and time-consuming. The company embodies a reverse transfection approach to phenotypic screening; this “is essentially a simplified version of what is currently done in multi-well plates” such as those used in both in vivo and in vitro high-throughput screening. As with this method, visualizing Persomics’ plates is made possible through the use of fluorescent dyes. In addition, visualization entails fluorescence microscopy, which is a powerful tool used for observing cellular responses and mechanisms.

== History ==
Persomics was founded in 2014, when it established itself as part of the Gatehouse Park biohub in Waltham, Massachusetts, which also houses AstraZeneca. In 2007, after many years of research pertaining to cures for infectious diseases at the Council for Scientific and Industrial Research (CSIR) in Pretoria, South Africa, Persomics made its decision to be based in the greater Boston area which “continues to remain the hub of life-saving scientific research”.

== See also ==
- Drug discovery
- Gene editing
- Personalized medicine
