= RNAi-Based Identification System and interference of Specific Cancer Cells =

A "classifier" is created to categorize cells by identifying specific characteristics of cervical cancer. These characteristics are consistent with HeLa cells, which serve as the target cell line for cell death. Upon identifying these cells, the classifier releases specific proteins within the HeLa cell that trigger apoptosis without killing or endangering neighboring, healthy cells.

The defining characteristics of these classifiers are elements whose levels within the cells create markers that can be measured. High markers and low markers are established, and a "classifier molecule" created to insert into prospective cells, which can induce apoptosis only when cells exhibit the threshold level of high or low markers. These classifiers use a small interfering RNA, which targets the repressor and activator in the Lac operon. This holds potential for therapeutic use, provided that an efficient delivery system can be established for in vivo DNA. In vitro applications are possible, provided the classifier molecule can be safely integrated into cultured cells.

== Cancer cell identification and classification ==
Cancer cells can be classified by identifying MicroRNA expression. These mRNA expression levels can be used as a diagnostic and prognostic tool in tumor and cancer classifications, although current tumor classification methods do not incorporate experimental knowledge. As is evident in experimental knowledge, different types of cancer can be associated with the irregular expression of particular miRNAs. Other parameters considered to be critical are the location of the miRNAs on the strand, cancer-associated genomic regions, epigenetic alteration of miRNA expression, and abnormalities in processing target genes and proteins. Recent evidence shows that miRNAs play an important role in human malignancies and could act as a tumor/oncogene suppressor.

== RNAi for apoptosis ==
Recently, it has been discovered that small RNA can trigger specific gene silencing in human cells. The RNAi reaction enables a complete elimination of a specific protein, which can potentially enable researchers to target pivotal structures within a cell to eliminate the cell altogether. RNAi silencing can also strongly inhibit proliferation of cells with genetic mutations that encourage oncogenic activation.

== RNAi delivery methods ==
Since its discovery, RNAi knowledge has grown substantially. Although quite useful, RNAi in vivo delivery to tissues proves to be a challenge that still eludes science—especially to deep tissues within the body. RNAi delivery is only easily accessible to surface tissues, such as the eye and respiratory tract. In these instances, siRNA has been used in direct contact with the tissue for transport, and the resulting RNAi has been extremely successful in focusing on target genes. When delivering siRNA to deep tissue layers within the body, measures need be taken to protect the siRNA from nucleases, but targeting specific areas becomes the main difficulty. This difficulty has been combatted with high-dosage levels of siRNA to ensure the tissues have been reached; however, in these cases, hepatotoxicity was reported.
