= Michael Green (biologist) =

American biologist (1954–2023)

- Born: January 20, 1954; Philadelphia, Pennsylvania, U.S.
- Died: February 10, 2023 (aged 69)
- Education: University of Wisconsin–Madison, Washington University in St. Louis
- Scientific career
- Fields: Cell biology, molecular biology
- Workplaces: University of Massachusetts Medical School
- Doctoral advisor: Robert G. Roeder
- Notable students: Phil Zamore

Michael Green (January 20, 1954 – February 10, 2023) was an American molecular biologist and cell biologist at the University of Massachusetts Medical School, where he was the chair of the Department of Molecular, Cell and Cancer Biology, director of the UMass Cancer Center, and a Howard Hughes Medical Institute investigator. Green was a member of the National Academy of Sciences and the National Academy of Medicine.

== Education and academic career ==
Green received his bachelor's degree in biochemistry from the University of Wisconsin–Madison. He then went on to Washington University School of Medicine, from which he graduated in 1981 with his M.D. and Ph.D. in biochemistry under the supervision of Robert G. Roeder. He worked as a postdoctoral fellow with Thomas Maniatis, then at Harvard University, before joining the faculty there in 1984. He moved from Harvard to the University of Massachusetts Medical School in 1990 and remained there until his death in 2023. He was the chair of the Department of Molecular, Cell and Cancer Biology and was named the director of the UMass Cancer Center in 2015.

Green became a Howard Hughes Medical Institute investigator in 1994. He was elected to the National Academy of Sciences in 2014 and to the National Academy of Medicine in 2015.

Green was a co-founder of a Cambridge, Massachusetts-based biotechnology company called Fulcrum Therapeutics.

== Research ==
Research in Green's laboratory focused on gene regulation, particularly on the regulation of gene transcription and of RNA splicing. The group also studies the effects of regulatory patterns on the behavior of cancer cells, using genome-wide RNA interference screens to identify genes involved in cell proliferation or apoptosis in the context of oncogenic mutations. In 2014, Green began studying the rare genetic disease Rett syndrome.

== Death ==
Green died on February 10, 2023, at the age of 69.
