= RNAa =

RNAA may mean:

- RNA activation, a small RNA-guided gene regulation phenomenon
- Radiochemical Neutron Activation Analysis, a nuclear process used for determining the concentrations of elements
