= J. Keith Motley =

American university administrator

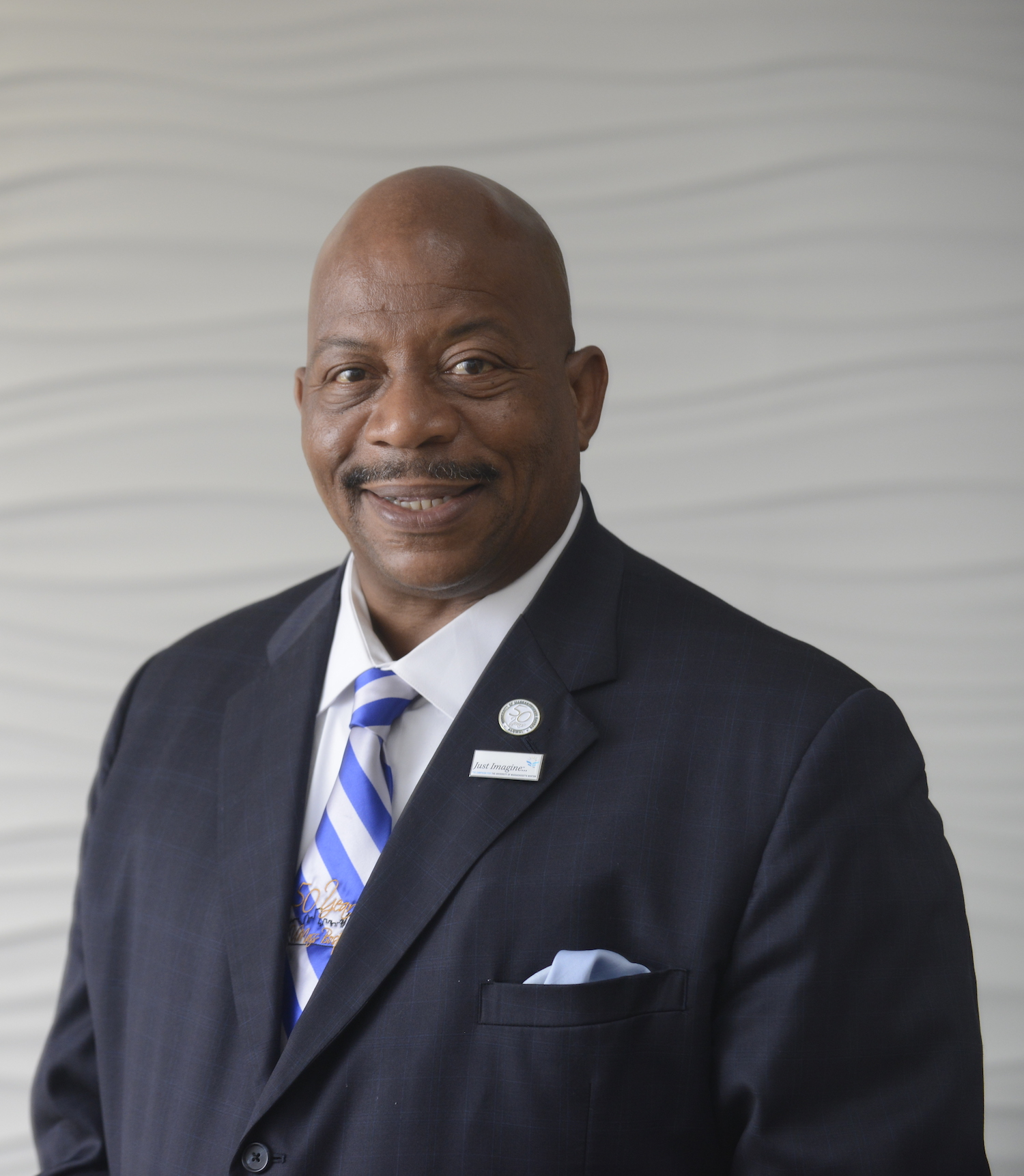

8th Chancellor of UMass Boston
- In office 1 July 2007 – 30 June 2017
- Preceded by: Michael F. Collins
- Succeeded by: Barry Mills (Interim)

Personal details
- Born: James Keith Motley; January 28, 1956 (age 70) Pittsburgh, Pennsylvania, U.S.
- Spouse: Angela
- Children: 3
- Education: Northeastern University (BA) (MA); Boston College (PhD)

James Keith Motley (born January 28, 1956, in Pittsburgh, Pennsylvania) is a former academic administrator who served as the eighth chancellor of the University of Massachusetts Boston.

== Personal life and background ==
Motley was born to Cornelia Motley Williams and John Motley Jr. He attended Peabody High School in Pittsburgh and is a graduate of the University of Pittsburgh's Upward Bound Program.

Motley was first recruited by renowned basketball coach Mike Jarvis to play Division 1 basketball at Northeastern University in 1972 as the first prospect of head coach Jim Calhoun. He earned the team's “Unsung Hero” award following his final season, among the various accolades he garnered over his college athletic career. He was inducted into the Northeastern University Hall of Fame in 1999 for “his contribution as a player, coach and advocate of the basketball program.”

Motley is a member of Iota Phi Theta fraternity and Sigma Pi Phi fraternity Beta Beta Boulé. In college, he was president of his fraternity and earned the Director's Award from the African American Institute as the Most Outstanding Black Senior.

Motley earned his BA and MA degrees from Northeastern University and a PhD from Boston College and is now married to Angela Motley, with whom he has three children.

== Career ==
=== Northeastern University ===
Upon graduation from Northeastern University in 1978, he was hired as an admissions counselor by his mentor, Jack Curry, former Dean of Admissions and Senior Vice President of the university, and Philip McCabe, former Dean of Admissions. Calhoun also hired him as a part-time assistant coach.

Motley went on to become Northeastern's Assistant Dean of Minority Affairs in 1982, Associate Dean and Director of the African American Institute in 1987, and Dean of Student Services in 1993, a position he held for 10 years prior to moving to University of Massachusetts Boston. He would help coach the basketball program for 20 years, during which time he recruited numerous Pittsburgh players to the university and helped lead the Huskies to seven appearances in the NCAA Tournament as an associate head coach. Following retirement from coaching, he served as president of the university's Courtside Club.

=== University of Massachusetts Boston ===
Motley was first hired by the University of Massachusetts Boston (UMass Boston) in 2003 as Vice Chancellor for Student Affairs. In 2004, he was named interim chancellor of the university and became a finalist to become chancellor after Jo Ann Gora became the president of Ball State University. In 2005, University of Massachusetts (UMass) System President Jack Wilson recommended Michael F. Collins, former chief executive of Caritas Christi Health System, for the permanent role, despite the support shown for Motley by many students, staff, faculty, and community leaders, including Boston Mayor Thomas M. Menino, a UMass Boston alumnus.

Motley went on to serve as vice president for business, marketing, and public affairs at the UMass System president's office, citing his hope that UMass Boston would move forward from the controversy. Less than two years later, Wilson announced a leadership rotation; following the retirement of UMass Medical School Chancellor Aaron Lazare, Collins moved to the Medical School to serve as interim chancellor, and Motley was ultimately named the eighth chancellor of UMass Boston. He is the first African American to serve as the university's chancellor.

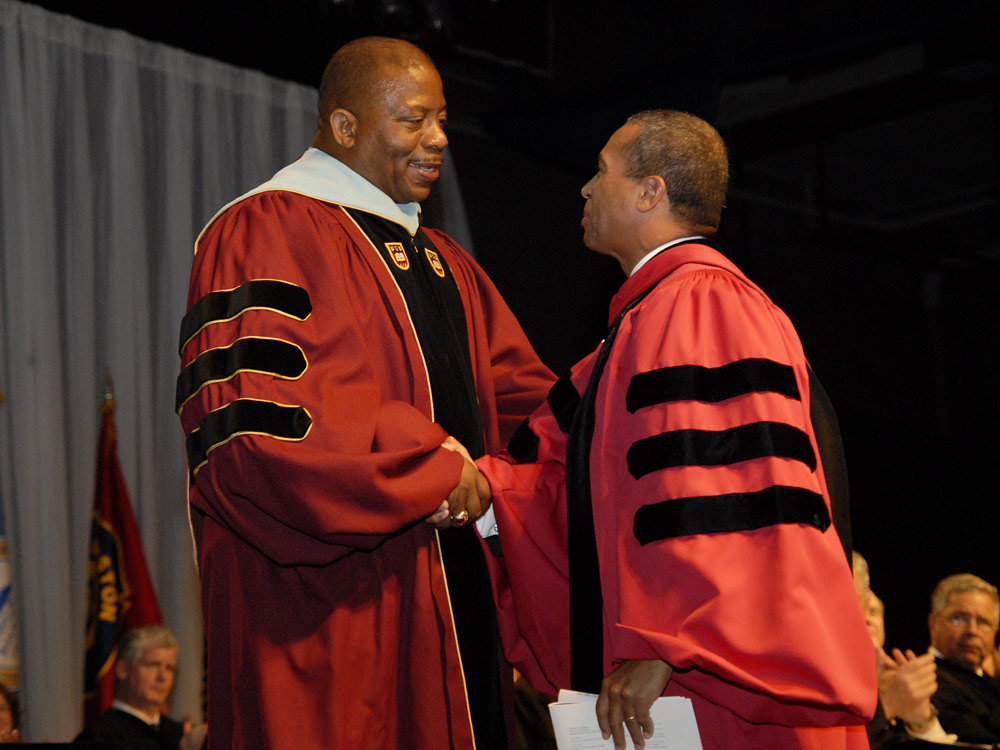
Motley (left) with Governor Deval Patrick during Motley's ceremonial inauguration as chancellor

Motley became chancellor of the UMass Boston on July 1, 2007, following more than 30 years of experience in higher education administration. As chancellor, he oversaw a strategic planning initiative to enhance the university's academic offerings and research enterprise, grow enrollment to meet the increasing demand for a well-educated workforce, and build the university as a resource of knowledge and public service. As the first African American chancellor of UMass Boston, which is considered the most diverse public university in New England, Motley highlighted inclusion among its key missions. Motley also oversaw its 25-year master plan to enhance the campus and improve its layout on Columbia Point. The project includes the construction of a new Integrated Sciences Complex, University Hall, and housing for students, as well as the Edward M. Kennedy Institute for the United States Senate, which the late senator requested to be located on the UMass Boston campus next to the John F. Kennedy Presidential Library and Museum.

On April 5, 2017, University of Massachusetts Boston officials announced that Motley would resign at the end of the academic calendar year on June 30, take a one-year sabbatical, and return as a tenured faculty member. UMass System President Marty Meehan stated that UMass Boston Deputy Chancellor Barry Mills, appointed the previous month, would serve as interim chancellor "until [university] finances are stabilized and the university is positioned to attract a world-class chancellor through a global search", specifically to address the university's 2017 operating budget deficit of $30 million. In response to the appointment of Mills and Motley's resignation announcement, UMass Boston faculty publicly expressed concern that Motley was being scapegoated for the university's budget deficit while Boston City Councilors Tito Jackson and Ayanna Pressley, Massachusetts State Senator Linda Dorcena Forry, and Massachusetts State Representative Russell Holmes called upon System President Meehan to reject Motley's resignation. On April 8, 2017, at a UMass System Board of Trustees meeting, UMass Boston faculty and students protested decisions by university administration to cut offerings of courses (many required for graduation) in the upcoming summer semester, as well as other programs and to make expense adjustments which reduced the deficit to approximately $6 million or $7 million.

On July 1, 2017, Mills became interim chancellor after Motley's resignation. In November 2017, an audit System President Marty Meehan commissioned from KPMG was presented to the System Board of Trustees that found that faulty record keeping, a lack of discipline in its budgeting process, and a failure on the part of UMass Boston administration to appreciate the cost of the campus renewal construction projects on the university's operating budget led to the university's $30 million budget deficit, and in the same month, the university laid-off 36 employees after laying off about 100 non-tenure track faculty the previous academic year. In April 2018, University of Massachusetts Amherst and Mount Ida College administrators announced that the former school would acquire the latter's campus in Newton after the latter college's closure. The acquisition was immediately opposed by UMass Boston faculty and students due to inadequate consultation with the Boston campus faculty, the Boston campus' budget deficit, and that because of the proximity of the Mount Ida campus to the Boston campus, the faculty contended that the new campus would compete with the Boston campus.

In April 2018, the UMass Boston campus was the sole campus in the UMass System with a majority-minority enrollment. In May 2018, following the approval of the sale by the office of Massachusetts Attorney General Maura Healey, the UMass Boston Faculty Council passed a motion of no confidence in System President Marty Meehan and the System Board of Trustees. In the same month, 10 days after three finalists for the UMass Boston Chancellor position were named, on May 21, 2018, all three finalists withdrew from consideration after faculty members questioned the qualifications of the candidates. On June 20, 2018, UMass System Senior Vice President for Academic Affairs Katherine Newman was appointed as the university's interim chancellor by the System Board of Trustees effective July 1, 2018.

In May 2019, the Pioneer Institute released a white paper co-authored by former Massachusetts State Representative Gregory W. Sullivan (who also served as the Massachusetts Inspector General) that reviewed records obtained from the UMass System Controller's Office (as well as other publicly available documents) that concluded that Motley and other UMass Boston administrators were scapegoated for the 2017 fiscal year $30 million budget deficit and that instead the approval by the System Board of Trustees of an accelerated 5-year capital spending plan in December 2014 without assuring that capital reserves would be made available to pay for the plan, as well as an error to a 5-year campus reserve ratio estimate prepared by the UMass Central Budget Office and presented to the System Board of Trustees in April 2016, was the cause of the $26 million in budget reductions implemented by interim Chancellor Barry Mills and that the reductions were made at the direction of the UMass Central Office.

Additionally, the white paper states that KPMG's 2017 audit was not conducted in accordance with Generally Accepted Government Auditing Standards or reported in accordance with auditing standards prescribed by the American Institute of Certified Public Accountants, and that the purchase of Mount Ida College in April 2018 was conducted by a wire transfer from the UMass System for $75 million without being included on the previously approved university capital plan at the time the UMass Central Office ordered the budget reductions rather than UMass Amherst purchasing the Mount Ida campus with loanable funds to be repaid with interest (and in contrast to how the transaction was described in a press statement issued by Meehan's office). The following month, interim Chancellor Katherine Newman issued a press statement disputing the findings of the white paper. In April 2023, UMass Boston administration named the dormitories constructed under the master plan Motley proposed in 2007 in honor of him and his wife at a dedication ceremony.

== Community service and honors ==
Motley is a founder of the Roxbury Preparatory Charter School and chair emeritus of the school's Board of Trustees. He also is the founder and education chair of Concerned Black Men of Massachusetts, Inc., and the Paul Robeson Institute for Positive Self-Development, an academic and social enrichment program for school-aged children of color. He also serves on numerous boards of community organizations with local, regional, and national reach, including:

- Carney Hospital (as chair of the board of trustees)
- Freedom House
- The Boston Foundation
- The Boston Municipal Research Bureau
- The Boston Sports Museum
- The Commonwealth Corporation
- The John F. Kennedy Library Foundation
- The Edward M. Kennedy Institute for the United States Senate

Motley also chairs the Boston Committee for the “Do the Write Thing Challenge,” an initiative of the National Campaign to Stop Violence.

He is former chair of the Newbury College Board of Trustees and was appointed as the co-chair of Success Boston, a college-completion initiative founded by former Boston mayor Thomas Menino. On a national level, he has chaired the American Association of State Colleges and Universities and is a mentor for its Millennium Leadership Initiative, a premier leadership development program that provides individuals from underrepresented populations in high-ranking positions in higher education the opportunity to gain a broader understanding of the higher education landscape, develop skills, and build the networks needed to advance to the presidency. He also serves on the boards of the Association of Public and Land Grant Universities (APLU) and New England Association of Schools and Colleges. He is a member of the American Council on Education’s Commission on Effective Leadership, past chair of APLU’s Commission on Access, Diversity and Excellence.

Motley was named to the Boston Business Journal's list of area influencers five years in a row. In 2016, he was named to Colette Phillips Communications Get Konnected! 100 list of Boston’s 100 Most Influential People of Color. The Boston Business Journal also selected him to receive its 2014 Leaders in Diversity Awards, which honor companies and businesspeople for their leadership in promoting inclusiveness and economic opportunity. In 2012, he was chosen by the Boston Globe as one of a dozen local leaders who have promoted diversity for its "Diversity Boston" list.
