= Small activating RNA =

Type of RNA that activates transcription of specific genes

Small activating RNAs (saRNAs) are small double-stranded RNAs (dsRNAs) that target gene promoters to induce transcriptional gene activation in a process known as RNA activation (RNAa).

Small dsRNAs, such as small interfering RNAs (siRNAs) and microRNAs (miRNAs), are known to be the trigger of an evolutionarily conserved mechanism known as RNA interference (RNAi). RNAi invariably leads to gene silencing via remodeling of chromatin to thereby suppress transcription, degrading complementary mRNA, or blocking protein translation. Later it was found that dsRNAs can also act to activate transcription and was thus designated saRNA. By targeting selected sequences in gene promoters, saRNAs induce target gene expression at the transcriptional/epigenetic level.

saRNAs are typically 21 nucleotides in length with a 2 nucleotide overhang at the 3' end of each strand, the same structure as a typical siRNA. To identify an saRNA that can activate a gene of interest, several saRNAs need to be designed within a 1- to 2-kbp promoter region by following a set of rules and tested in cultured cells. In some reports, saRNAs are designed in such a way to target non-coding transcripts that overlap the promoter sequence of a protein coding gene. Both chemically synthesized saRNAs and saRNAs expressed as short hairpin RNA (shRNA) have been used in in vitro and in vivo experiments.

An online resource for saRNAs has been developed to integrate experimentally verified saRNAs and proteins involved.

Therapeutic use of saRNAs have been suggested. They have been tested in animal models to treat bladder tumors, liver carcinogenesis, pancreatic cancer,, obesity and erectile dysfunction.

In 2016, a phase I clinical trial involving advanced liver cancer patients was launched for the saRNA drug MTL-CEBPA. It aimed to complete in 2021.
