= Silence Therapeutics =

British pharmaceutical company

Silence Therapeutics PLC
- Type: Public (Nasdaq: SLN)
- Industry: Pharmaceuticals
- Founded: 1994
- Headquarters: Hammersmith, London,
- Number of employees: 120
- Website: www.silence-therapeutics.com

Silence Therapeutics (Nasdaq: SLN) is a London-based pharmaceutical company formed in 1994. The company has pioneered the development of short-interfering ribonucleic acid (siRNA) therapeutics for the treatment of rare diseases. Silence Therapeutics has offices in London, New Jersey, and Berlin, with its corporate headquarters located in Hammersmith, London.

== Development ==
Silence Therapeutics develops medicines related to RNA interference or RNAi to inhibit the expression of specific target genes thought to play a role in the pathology of diseases with significant unmet needs. Silence's mRNA GOLD platform can be used to create siRNAs (short interfering RNAs) that target and silence disease-associated genes in the liver.

Silence Therapeutic's product candidates include SLN124 for hematological diseases and zerlasiran (formerly SLN360) for reducing cardiovascular risk in people born with high levels of lipoprotein(a), a genetic risk factor for cardiovascular disease. The company reported in November 2023 that a phase 1 study showed injection of repeated doses reduced patients' baseline of Lp(a) by up to 99 per cent for 90 days after.

== Partnerships ==
Silence Therapeutics is under the stewardship of CEO Craig Tooman, and has established partnerships with pharmaceutical companies, such as AstraZeneca, Mallinckrodt Pharmaceuticals, and Hansoh Pharma, among others.
