= Sirna Therapeutics =

Biotechnology company

Sirna Therapeutics, Inc. was a San Francisco, California based biotechnology company that explored the use of RNA interference in human disease therapy. Sirna's development pipeline included several small interfering RNA (siRNA) drugs, thought to stably silence the expression of specific disease-related genes. Sirna's clinical trial of an siRNA-based treatment for age-related macular degeneration was the first such trial for an siRNA drug.

Sirna Therapeutics was acquired by Merck & Co. in 2006, the cash transaction deal was worth $1.1 billion.

== Headquarters and laboratory ==
Sirna maintained its laboratory on the northeastern edge of Boulder, Colorado. Originally the corporate headquarters were also located in Boulder.

Sirna selected San Francisco due to its proximity to various scientific institutions, its workforce, and the payroll tax exemption for biotechnology companies. Sirna's move was a part of a trend of biotechnology companies moving to San Francisco, bolstered due to a campaign to attract biotechnology companies to San Francisco and tax breaks instituted by Mayor of San Francisco Gavin Newsom.

The mayor's office, the Chamber of Commerce, and the San Francisco Center for Economic Development contributed to bringing Sirna to San Francisco. Howard Robin, the president and chief executive officer of Sirna, said that the first wave of moves would be the ten highest ranking employees; he did not say how many employees would relocate to San Francisco. The company planned to maintain a facility in Boulder.
