= Dharmacon =

Dharmacon, Inc.
- Type: Subsidiary
- Industry: Biotech
- Founded: 1995 by Stephen Scaringe
- Headquarters: Lafayette, CO, USA
- Products: CRISPR, RNAi, siRNA, miRNA, shRNA, cDNA, ORFs, Transfection Reagents
- Number of employees: 150 (2014)
- Website: www.dharmacon.com

Dharmacon Inc., now known as Dharmacon, was founded in 1995 by Stephen Scaringe as Dharmacon Research to develop and commercialize a new technology for RNA oligonucleotide synthesis. Originally, the company's focus was to develop 2'-ACE RNA technology as the standard for RNA synthesis and to advance RNA oligo-dependent applications and technologies.

When RNA interference (RNAi) emerged in the late 1990s, Dharmacon was poised to provide RNAi-related products to the multitude of academic and industry researchers. Dharmacon has become an important resource for those investigating the mechanisms of siRNA (small interfering RNA)-induced gene knockdown and applying the specificity and potency of RNAi to human biotherapeutics. Dharmacon's expertise in bioinformatics, RNA biology, and synthesis chemistry has allowed it to develop a complete line of products for the RNAi researcher.

== History ==
In November 2002, Dharmacon Research, Inc. officially changed its name to Dharmacon, Inc., as it had advanced beyond research and development and into whole solutions for RNA oligo-dependent applications and technologies. In March 2004, Dharmacon became a wholly owned subsidiary of Fisher Scientific International, Inc. In November 2006, Fisher Scientific International, Inc. merged with Thermo Electron Corporation to become Thermo Fisher Scientific.

In April 2013, Thermo Fisher Scientific reached an agreement to buy Life Technologies Corporation. The acquisition of Life Technologies Corporation received conditional approval from the European Commission in November 2013. The conditional requirement was the divestment of Thermo Fisher Scientific's cell culture (sera and media), magnetic beads and Dharmacon gene modulation businesses for antitrust reasons.

In early January 2014, GE Healthcare reached an agreement with Thermo Fisher Scientific to acquire the cell culture, magnetic bead and Dharmacon gene modulation businesses for US$1.05 billion. The acquisition of Dharmacon is viewed as complementary to GE Healthcare's drug discovery research technologies.

In the fall of 2014, GE Healthcare announced it had reached a licensing agreement with the Broad Institute of MIT and Harvard granting access to CRISPR-Cas9 intellectual property. Under the agreement, GE Healthcare is able to incorporate the patented technologies, and develop and launch additional complementary gene editing reagents. Then, in October 2014, GE Healthcare Dharmacon launched its first CRISPR-Cas9 genome engineering products under the “Edit-R” brand. In July 2015, GE Healthcare Dharmacon launched synthetic crRNA and lentiviral sgRNA pre-designed with a functionally validated algorithm against entire human, mouse and rat genomes.

In July 2017, UK firm Horizon Discovery reached an agreement to acquire Dharmacon from GE Healthcare for a total consideration of $85 million. The acquisition is expected to complement Horizon's portfolio of gene editing products and engineered cell lines.
