= Classical pharmacology =

Drug discovery by phenotypic screening

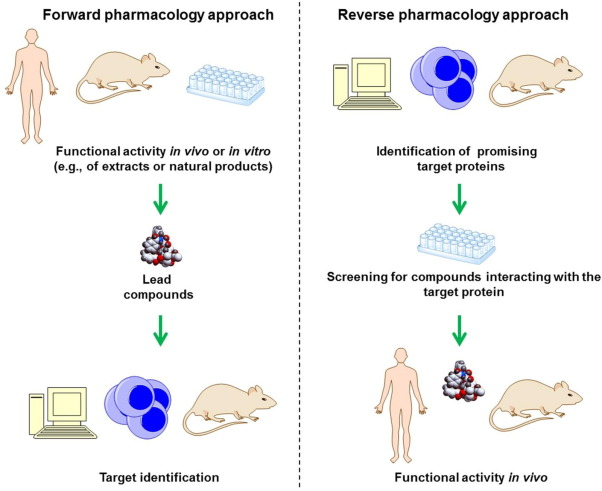
Forward (classical) and reverse pharmacology approaches in drug discovery

In the field of drug discovery, classical pharmacology, also known as forward pharmacology, or phenotypic drug discovery (PDD), relies on phenotypic screening (screening in intact cells or whole organisms) of chemical libraries of synthetic small molecules, natural products or extracts to identify substances that have a desirable therapeutic effect. Using the techniques of medicinal chemistry, the potency, selectivity, and other properties of these screening hits are optimized to produce candidate drugs.

== Historical background ==
Classical pharmacology traditionally has been the basis for the discovery of new drugs. Compounds are screened in cellular or animal models of disease to identify compounds that cause a desirable change in phenotype. Only after the compounds have been discovered, an effort is made to determine the biological target of the compounds through target validation experiments often involving chemoproteomics. More recently it has become popular to develop a hypothesis that a certain biological target is disease modifying and screen for compounds that modulate the activity of this purified target. Afterwards, these compounds are tested in animals to see if they have the desired effect. This approach is known as "reverse pharmacology" or "target based drug discovery" (TDD). However, recent statistical analysis reveals that a disproportionate number of first-in-class drugs with novel mechanisms of action come from phenotypic screening, which has led to a resurgence of interest in this method.

== Similarity with pharmacognosy ==
Pharmacognosy, the investigation of botanics used in indigenous medical traditions is essentially classical pharmacology. Pharmacognosy and classical pharmacology are both often contrasted with reverse pharmacology, that is, working from the target backward to identify new drugs starting with screening libraries of compounds for affinity for particular target. In pharmacognosy, folk medicines are first tested in clinical trials for efficacy. Only after efficacy has been established, is an effort made to determine the biologic target of the drug.

== See also ==
- Reverse pharmacology
- Phenotypic screening
- Pharmacognosy
- Chemoproteomics
