= Endoribonuclease-prepared siRNA =

esiRNA or Endoribonuclease-prepared siRNAs are a mixture of siRNA oligos resulting from cleavage of long double-stranded RNA (dsRNA) with an endoribonuclease such as Escherichia coli RNase III or Dicer.

An alternative concept to the usage of chemically synthesized siRNA for RNA Interference (RNAi) is the enzymatic digestion of long double stranded RNAs in vitro. In this case a cDNA template is amplified by PCR and tagged with two bacteriophage-promoter sequences. RNA polymerase is then used to generate long double stranded RNA that is homologous to the target-gene cDNA. This RNA is subsequently digested with RNase III from Escherichia coli to generate short overlapping fragments of siRNAs with a length between 18 and 25 base pairs. This complex mixture of short double stranded RNAs is similar to the mixture generated by Dicer cleavage in vivo and is therefore called endoribonuclease-prepared siRNA or short esiRNA. esiRNA are a heterogeneous mixture of siRNAs that all target the same mRNA sequence. These multiple silencing triggers lead to highly specific and effective gene silencing.
