= VIRsiRNAdb =

Content
- Description: experimentally validated viral siRNA/shRNA.

Contact
- Authors: Nishant Thakur
- Primary citation: Thakur & al. (2012)
- Release date: 2011

Access
- Website: http://crdd.osdd.net/servers/virsirnadb.

VIRsiRNAdb is a database of siRNA/shRNA targeting viral genome regions.

== See also ==
- siRNA
- shRNA
