= Aaron Lazare =

University chancellor and Dean (1936 – 2015)

- Born: February 14, 1936; Bayonne, New Jersey, U.S
- Died: July 14, 2015 (aged 79); Newton, Massachusetts, U.S
- Resting place: The Episcopal Church of The Good Shepherd Garden, Waban, Massachusetts, U.S
- Education: Oberlin College (Bachelor of Arts); Case Western Reserve University School of Medicine (MD)
- Occupations: Psychiatrist; research professor; author
- Spouse: Louise Cannon (m. 1962)
- Children: 8
- Writing career
- Language: English

Aaron Lazare (February 14, 1936 – July 14, 2015) was the Chancellor and Dean of the University of Massachusetts Medical School, in Worcester, Massachusetts, from May 15, 1991 until March 15, 2007. He died on July 14, 2015, due to complications from kidney cancer.

On June 13, 2002, the recently built $100 million research building on the Medical School campus was officially named the "Aaron Lazare Medical Research Building" at the request of Framingham, MA entrepreneur and philanthropist Jack Blais and his wife, Shelly, who donated $21 million toward its construction. Until 2021, Blais' donation was the largest gift from an individual in the history of the University of Massachusetts.
