= Small interfering RNA =

Biomolecule

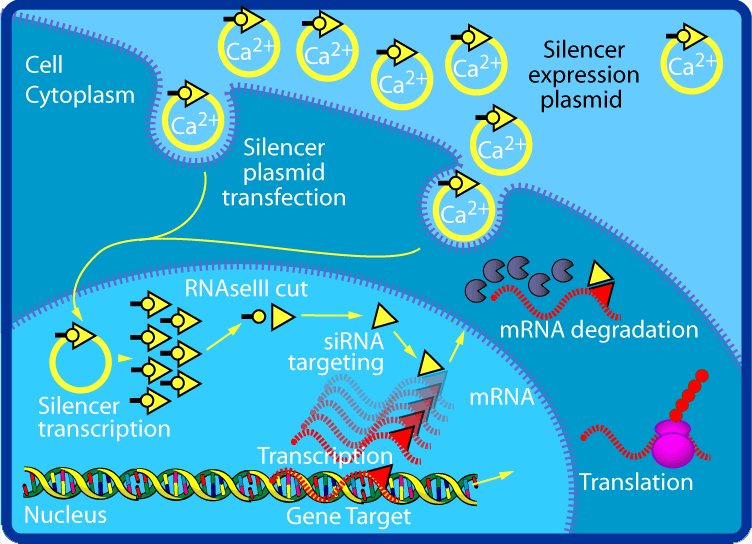
Mediating RNA interference in cultured mammalian cells.

Small interfering RNA (siRNA), sometimes known as short interfering RNA or silencing RNA, is a class of short, double-stranded, non-coding RNA molecules that operate within the RNA interference (RNAi) pathway. siRNAs cause inhibition of gene expression by degrading mRNAs whose sequence is complementary to that of the siRNA.

== Structure ==

Naturally occurring siRNAs have a well-defined structure that is a short (usually 20 to 24-bp) double-stranded RNA (dsRNA) with phosphorylated 5' ends and hydroxylated 3' ends with two overhanging nucleotides.

== History ==
RNA interference was first phenomenologically described in 1990 by the group of Richard Jorgensen, who attempted to increase the expression of the chalcone synthase (CHS) in petunias by introducing CHS transgenes in the form of double-stranded DNA (dsDNA), but instead found that the CHS expression was reduced.

Similar observations were made five years later by Guo and Kemphues in animals, who used antisense RNA of the par-1 gene to inhibit par-1 gene expression by injection into the gonads of C. elegans. Inhibition of gene expression by antisense RNA was a known effect at the time, but in an attempt to use the sense par-1 RNA as a control, Guo and Kemphues again found par-1 gene expression to be inhibited.

These findings were rationalized by the discovery of the RNA interference mechanism by Andrew Fire, Craig Mello and colleagues in 1998. They showed that only double-stranded RNA is involved in gene silencing, as the combined addition of sense and antisense RNA elicted a much stronger effect than single-stranded RNA. The finding of Guo and Kemphues was explained by the presence of a double-stranded RNA contamination in the sense RNA, and Jorgensen's finding could retrospectively be attributed to the generation of double-stranded RNA through complex transgene arrays that formed during the generation of the CHS transgenes.

Usage of RNAi was initially limited to plants and invertebrates, as the interferon response of mammalian cells caused by siRNAs led to a general inhibition of translation, resulting in a loss of the siRNA's specificity to its target mRNA. Elbashir, Tuschl, and collegues discovered in 2001 that the usage of synthetic dsRNA of 21 nucleotides of length bypasses the interferon response, restoring the siRNA's specificity.

The possibility of designing siRNAs that target any mRNA of choice led to increased investments by pharmaceutical companies, including the launch of multiple companies, such as Sirna Therapeutics, Silence Therapeutics, Tekmira,and Alnylam Pharmaceuticals, as decreasing the amount of proteins not susceptible to classical small molecule drugs was recognized as therapeutically valuable.

The Nobel Prize in Physiology or Medicine 2006 was jointly awarded to Andrew Fire and Craig Mellow "for their discovery of RNA interference - gene silencing by double-stranded RNA".

Large, established pharmaceutical companies (e.g. Merck, Takeda, Roche, Novartis) entered the siRNA market between 2005 and 2008, but unrealistic expections and technological setbacks concerning drug delivery, toxicity, and efficacy caused these companies to decrease their investments in RNA interference technology between 2008 and 2011.

In 2018, the drug patisiran from Alnylam Pharmaceuticals was the first RNAi drug to be approved by the U.S. Food and Drug Administration (FDA), targeting Hereditary transthyretin amyloidosis (hATTR), a rare condition that can impair heart and nerve function.

While patisiran uses lipid nanoparticles for drug delivery, as of 2024, conjugation of N-acetylgalactosamine (GalNAc) to siRNAs is the dominant platform of delivery of siRNAs to the liver. The uptake of GalNAc-siRNA by the liver is based on the tight binding of GalNAc to the asialoglycoprotein receptor (ASGPR) and subseqent clathrin-mediated endocytosis, which was first reported in 2014 by Nair, Manoharan, and colleagues.

As of 2026, eight siRNA-based drugs have received approval from the FDA, seven of which are GalNAc conjugates (see § Applications).

== Mechanism ==
The mechanism by which natural siRNA causes gene silencing through repression of translation occurs as follows:

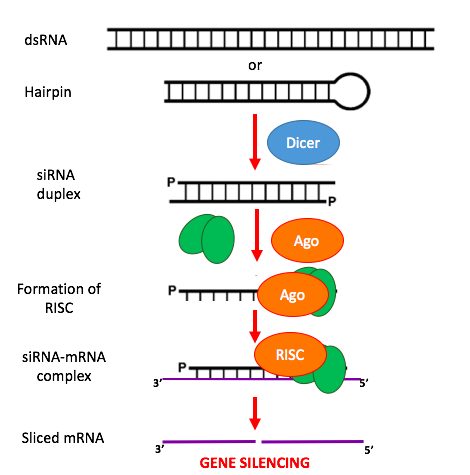
siRNA Mechanism.

1. Long dsRNA (which can come from hairpin, complementary RNAs, and RNA-dependent RNA polymerases) is cleaved by an endo-ribonuclease called Dicer. Dicer cuts the long dsRNA to form short interfering RNA or siRNA; this is what enables the molecules to form the RNA-Induced Silencing Complex (RISC).
2. Once siRNA enters the cell, it gets incorporated into other proteins to form the RISC.
3. Once the siRNA is part of the RISC complex, the siRNA is unwound to form single-stranded siRNA.
4. The strand that is thermodynamically less stable due to its base pairing at the 5' end is chosen to remain part of the RISC complex.
5. The single-stranded siRNA, which is part of the RISC complex, can now scan and find a complementary mRNA.
6. Once the single-stranded siRNA (part of the RISC complex) binds to its target mRNA, it induces mRNA cleavage.
7. The mRNA is now cut and recognized as abnormal by the cell. This causes degradation of the mRNA and, in turn, no translation of the mRNA into amino acids and then proteins, thus silencing the gene that encodes that mRNA.

siRNA is also similar to miRNA; however, miRNAs are derived from shorter stemloop RNA products. miRNAs typically silence genes by repression of translation and have broader specificity of action, while siRNAs typically work with higher specificity by cleaving the mRNA before translation, with 100% complementarity.

== RNAi induction using siRNAs or their biosynthetic precursors ==
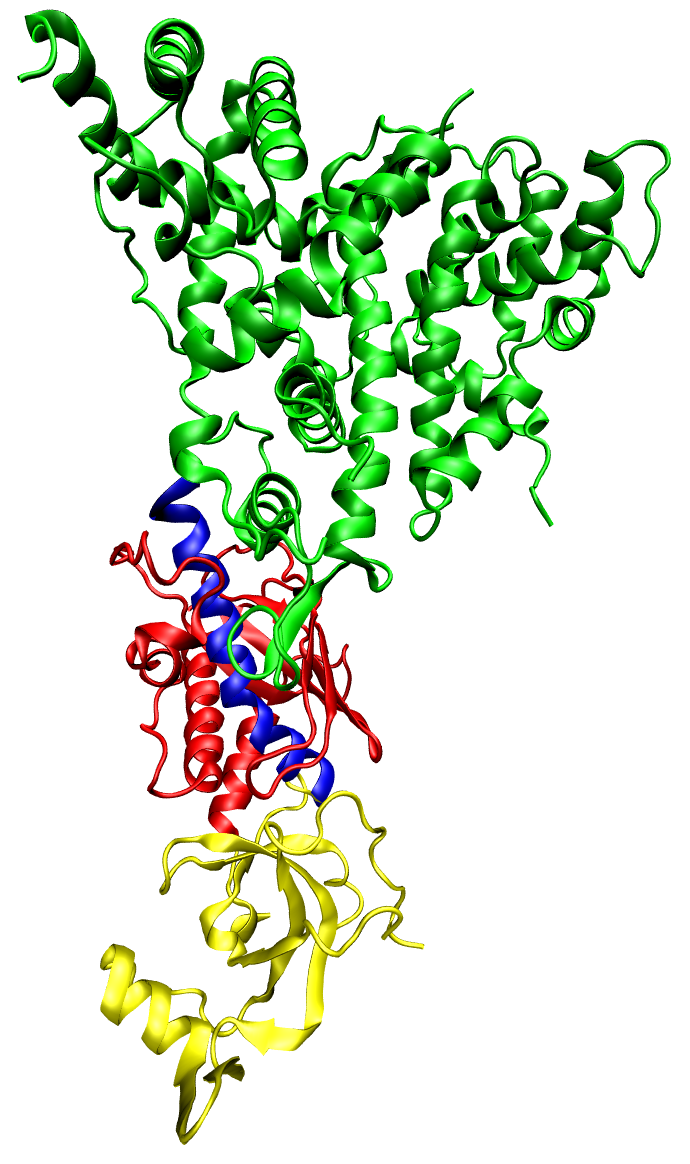
Dicer protein colored by protein domain.

Gene knockdown by transfection of exogenous siRNA is only transient, especially in rapidly dividing cells. This may be overcome by creating an expression vector for the siRNA. The siRNA sequence is modified to introduce a short loop between the two strands. The resulting transcript is a short hairpin RNA (shRNA), which can be processed into a functional siRNA by Dicer in its usual fashion. Typical transcription cassettes use an RNA polymerase III promoter (e.g., U6 or H1) to direct the transcription of small nuclear RNAs (snRNAs, where U6 is involved in RNA splicing; H1 is the RNase component of human RNase P). It is theorized that the resulting siRNA transcript is then processed by Dicer.

The gene knockdown efficiency can also be improved by using cell squeezing.

The activity of siRNAs in RNAi is largely dependent on its binding ability to the RNA-induced silencing complex (RISC). Binding of the duplex siRNA to RISC is followed by unwinding and cleavage of the sense strand with endonucleases. The remaining anti-sense strand-RISC complex can then bind to target mRNAs for initiating transcriptional silencing.

== RNA activation ==
In addition to their role in RNAi, siRNAs can also activate gene expression, a phenomenon termed "RNA activation" or RNAa. This was first observed when synthetic siRNAs, termed "small activating RNA" (saRNA), targeting gene promoters were found to induce potent transcriptional activation of target genes. RNAa has been demonstrated to be a conserved mechanism, observed across species from insects, C. elegans, and plants, to mammals (including humans).

The mechanism of RNAa involves the targeting of promoter regions by saRNAs, leading to the recruitment of transcriptional machinery and epigenetic changes that promote gene expression. This process often involves the RNA-induced transcriptional activation (RITA) complex, which includes Argonaute proteins (particularly Ago2), RNA helicase A (RHA), and CTR9. Endogenous miRNAs can also mediate RNAa, expanding the regulatory roles of these small RNAs beyond gene silencing.

Several saRNA-based therapeutics are currently in clinical development. MTL-CEBPA, developed by MiNA Therapeutics, targets the CEBPA gene and is in Phase II trials for liver cancer. RAG-01, developed by Ractigen Therapeutics, targets the p21 gene and is in Phase I trials for non-muscle invasive bladder cancer (NMIBC). These clinical trials represent a significant step towards translating the RNAa phenomenon into novel therapeutic strategies.

== Post-transcriptional gene silencing ==
Richard Carthew et al. state in their 2004 study of siRNA/miRNA silencing pathways in Drosophila that siRNA-induced post-transcriptional gene silencing is initiated by the assembly of the RNA-induced silencing complex (RISC). RISC silences expression of certain genes by cleaving the mRNA molecules coding those genes. To begin the process in that system, they state that one of the two siRNA strands, the anti-sense guide strand, is loaded into the RISC while the other strand, the sense passenger strand, is degraded; they go on to state that certain Drosophila Dicer enzymes may be responsible for loading the guide strand into RISC. Then, in a perspective from 2009, the view is offered that "siRNA scans for and directs RISC" to a perfectly complementary sequence on the mRNA molecules.

The cleavage of the mRNA molecules is thought to be catalyzed by the Piwi domain of Argonaute proteins of the RISC; the mRNA molecule is then cut precisely by cleaving the phosphodiester bond between the target nucleotides which are paired to siRNA residues 10 and 11, counting from the 5'end. As Orban and Izaurralde note with regard to a further study in Drosophila cells, "[f]ollowing this initial endonucleolytic cleavage, the mRNA is [further] degraded" by cellular exonucleases; they show that in this system, the 5' fragments "are rapidly degraded from their 3' ends by the exosomes, whereas the 3' fragments are degraded from their 5' ends by XRN1", a 5'-3' exoribonuclease. Dissociation of the target mRNA strand from RISC after the cleavage allows more mRNA to be silenced; this dissociation process is likely to be promoted by extrinsic factors driven by ATP hydrolysis.

Sometimes, cleavage of the target mRNA molecule does not occur. In some cases, the endonucleolytic cleavage of the phosphodiester backbone may be suppressed by mismatches of siRNA and target mRNA near the cleaving site. Other times, the Argonaute proteins of the RISC lack endonuclease activity even when the target mRNA and siRNA are perfectly paired. In such cases, gene expression will be silenced by an miRNA-induced mechanism instead.

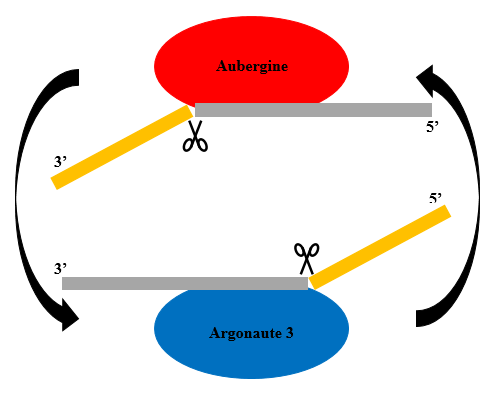
A simplified version of the Ping-Pong mechanism, involving proteins Aubergine (Aub) and Argonaute-3 (Ago3) cleaving the 3' and 5' ends of piRNA.

Piwi-interacting RNAs (piRNAs) are a recently discovered class of small non-coding RNAs (ncRNAs) with a length of 21–35 nucleotides. They play a role in gene expression regulation, transposon silencing, and viral infection inhibition. As stated by Monga and Banerjee in their primary report abstract, "Once considered as 'dark matter' of ncRNAs, piRNAs emerged as important players in multiple cellular functions in different organisms." In particular, as of 2019 they were characterised as not being siRNAs and as being responsible for the silencing of transposons.

=== Transcriptional gene silencing ===
Many model organisms, such as plants (Arabidopsis thaliana), yeast (Saccharomyces cerevisiae), flies (Drosophila melanogaster), and worms (C. elegans), have been used to study small non-coding RNA-directed transcriptional gene silencing. In human cells, RNA-directed transcriptional gene silencing was observed in 2016 when exogenous siRNAs silenced a transgenic elongation factor 1α (EF1a) promoter driving a green fluorescent protein (GFP) reporter gene. The main mechanisms of transcriptional gene silencing (TGS) involving the RNAi machinery include DNA methylation, histone post-translational modifications, and subsequent chromatin remodeling around the target gene into a heterochromatic state.

==== RITS complexes ====
siRNAs can be incorporated into a RNA-induced transcriptional silencing (RITS) complex. An active RITS complex will trigger the formation of heterochromatin around DNA matching the siRNA, effectively silencing the genes in that region of the DNA.

== Applications ==
One of the potent applications of siRNAs is the ability to distinguish the target versus non-target sequence with a single-nucleotide difference. This approach has been considered therapeutically crucial for silencing dominant gain-of-function (GOF) disorders, where the mutant allele causing disease differs from the wild-type allele by a single nucleotide (nt). These types of siRNAs, which are capable of distinguishing a single-nucleotide difference, are termed allele-specific siRNAs.

ASP-RNAi is an innovative category of RNAi with the objective of suppressing the dominant mutant allele while sparing expression of the corresponding normal allele with the specificity of single-nucleotide differences between the two. ASP-siRNAs are potentially a novel and better remedial alternative for the treatment of autosomal dominant genetic disorders, especially in cases where wild-type allele expression is crucial for organism survival, such as Huntington disease (HD), DYT1 dystonia (Gonzalez-Alegre et al. 2003, 2005), Alzheimer's disease (AD) (Sierant et al. 2011), Parkinson's disease (PD) (Takahashi et al. 2015), amyotrophic lateral sclerosis (ALS) (Schwarz et al. 2006), and Machado-Joseph disease (MJD) (Alves et al. 2008). Their therapeutic potential has also been assessed for various skin disorders like epidermolysis bullosa simplex (Atkinson et al. 2011), epidermolytic palmoplantar keratoderma (EPPK) (Lyu et al. 2016), and lattice corneal dystrophy type I (LCDI) (Courtney et al. 2014).

=== Approved drugs and clinical pharmacology ===
Approved siRNA drugs cover a range of indications and mRNA targets, utilizing various strategies to achieve intracellular delivery.

FDA-approved siRNA therapeutics (selected)
Drug	Brand name	Target gene	Indication	Delivery system
Patisiran	Onpattro	TTR	hATTR amyloidosis	LNP (IV)
Givosiran	Givlaari	ALAS1	Acute hepatic porphyria	GalNAc (SC)
Lumasiran	Oxlumo	HAO1	Primary hyperoxaluria type 1	GalNAc (SC)
Inclisiran	Leqvio	PCSK9	Hypercholesterolaemia	GalNAc (SC)
Vutrisiran	Amvuttra	TTR	hATTR amyloidosis	GalNAc (SC)
Fitusiran	Alhemo	SERPINC1 (antithrombin)	Haemophilia A/B	GalNAc (SC)
Nedosiran	Rivfloza	LDHA	Primary hyperoxaluria type 2/3	GalNAc (SC)

== Challenges ==
RNAi intersects with a number of other pathways; as of 2010, it was not surprising that, on occasion, nonspecific effects were triggered by the experimental introduction of an siRNA. When a mammalian cell encounters a double-stranded RNA such as an siRNA, it may mistake it as a viral by-product and mount an immune response. Furthermore, because structurally related microRNAs modulate gene expression largely via incomplete complementarity base pair interactions with a target mRNA, the introduction of an siRNA may cause unintended off-targeting. Chemical modifications of siRNA may alter the thermodynamic properties that also result in a loss of single nucleotide specificity.

Because siRNA drugs are oligonucleotides rather than small molecules, they are not substrates for cytochrome P450 enzymes and do not induce or inhibit CYP-mediated metabolism at clinically relevant concentrations. Drug–drug interaction (DDI) assessment therefore focuses on endocytic transporter pathways, off-target mRNA silencing, and in cases where the silenced target gene encodes a regulator of drug metabolism secondary effects on CYP or transporter expression.

=== Innate immunity ===
Introduction of too many siRNAs can result in nonspecific events due to activation of innate immune responses. Most evidence to date suggests that this is probably due to activation of the dsRNA sensor PKR, although retinoic acid-inducible gene I (RIG-I) may also be involved. The induction of cytokines via toll-like receptor 7 (TLR7) has also been described. Chemical modification of siRNA is employed to reduce the activation of the innate immune response for gene function and therapeutic applications. One promising method of reducing the nonspecific effects is to convert the siRNA into a microRNA. MicroRNAs occur naturally, and by harnessing this endogenous pathway it should be possible to achieve similar gene knockdown at comparatively low concentrations of resulting siRNAs, to minimize nonspecific effects.

=== Off-targeting ===
Off-targeting is another challenge to the use of siRNAs as a gene knockdown tool. Here, genes with incomplete complementarity are inadvertently downregulated by the siRNA (in effect, the siRNA acts as a miRNA), leading to problems in data interpretation and potential toxicity. This, however, can be partly addressed by designing appropriate control experiments, and siRNA design algorithms are currently being developed to produce siRNAs free from off-targeting. Genome-wide expression analysis, e.g., by microarray technology, can then be used to verify this and further refine the algorithms. A 2006 paper from the laboratory of Anastasia Khvorova implicates 6- or 7-basepair-long stretches from position 2 onward in the siRNA matching with 3'UTR regions in off-targeted genes. The tool of siRNA off-target prediction is available at http://crdd.osdd.net/servers/aspsirna/asptar.php and published as ASPsiRNA resource.

=== Adaptive immune responses ===
Plain RNAs may be poor immunogens, but antibodies can easily be created against RNA-protein complexes. These types of antibodies are seen in many autoimmune diseases. There have not yet been reports of antibodies against siRNA bound to proteins. Some methods for siRNA delivery attach polyethylene glycol (PEG) to the oligonucleotide, reducing excretion and improving circulating half-life. However, a large Phase III trial of PEGylated RNA aptamer against factor IX had to be discontinued by Regado Biosciences because of a severe anaphylactic reaction to the PEG part of the RNA. This reaction led to death in some cases and raises significant concerns about siRNA delivery when PEGylated oligonucleotides are involved.

=== Saturation of the RNAi machinery ===
siRNAs transfection into cells typically lowers the expression of many genes; however, the upregulation of genes is also observed. The upregulation of gene expression can partially be explained by the predicted gene targets of endogenous miRNAs. Computational analyses of more than 150 siRNA transfection experiments support a model where exogenous siRNAs can saturate the endogenous RNAi machinery, resulting in the de-repression of endogenous miRNA-regulated genes. Thus, while siRNAs can produce unwanted off-target effects, i.e., unintended downregulation of mRNAs via a partial sequence match between the siRNA and target, the saturation of RNAi machinery is another distinct nonspecific effect, which involves the de-repression of miRNA-regulated genes and results in similar problems in data interpretation and potential toxicity.

== Chemical modification ==

siRNAs have been chemically modified to enhance their therapeutic properties, such as decreasing immunostimulation, off-targeting effects, and siRNA degradation by nucleases. Modifications of the ribose, phosphodiester linkage, and nucleobase have been shown to allow for RNA interference while providing some of the aforementioned benefits. A detailed database of all such chemical modifications is manually curated as siRNAmod in scientific literature. Chemical modification of siRNA can also inadvertently result in loss of single-nucleotide specificity.

== Therapeutic applications ==
Given the ability to knock down, in essence, any gene of interest, RNAi via siRNAs presents opportunities in both basic and applied biology.

One of the biggest challenges to siRNA and RNAi-based therapeutics is intracellular delivery. siRNA also has weak stability and pharmacokinetic behavior. Delivery of siRNA via nanoparticles has shown promise. siRNA oligos in vivo are vulnerable to degradation by plasma and tissue endonucleases and exonucleases and have shown only mild effectiveness in localized delivery sites, such as the human eye. Delivering pure DNA to target organisms is challenging because its large size and structure prevent it from diffusing readily across membranes. siRNA oligos circumvent this problem due to their small size of 21–23 nucleotides. This allows delivery via nano-scale delivery vehicles called nanovectors.

A good nanovector for siRNA delivery should protect siRNA from degradation, enrich siRNA in the target organ, and facilitate the cellular uptake of siRNA. The three main groups of siRNA nanovectors are: lipid based, non-lipid organic-based, and inorganic. Lipid based nanovectors are excellent for delivering siRNA to solid tumors, but other cancers may require different non-lipid based organic nanovectors such as cyclodextrin based nanoparticles.

siRNAs delivered via lipid based nanoparticles have been shown to have therapeutic potential for central nervous system (CNS) disorders. Central nervous disorders are not uncommon, but the blood brain barrier (BBB) often blocks access of potential therapeutics to the brain. siRNAs that target and silence efflux proteins on the BBB surface have been shown to create an increase in BBB permeability. siRNA delivered via lipid based nanoparticles is able to cross the BBB completely.

A huge difficulty in siRNA delivery is the problem of off-targeting. Since genes are read in both directions, there exists a possibility that even if the intended antisense siRNA strand is read and knocks out the target mRNA, the sense siRNA strand may target another protein involved in another function.

Phase I results of the first two therapeutic RNAi trials (indicated for age-related macular degeneration, aka AMD) reported at the end of 2005 that siRNAs are well tolerated and have suitable pharmacokinetic properties.

In a phase 1 clinical trial, 41 patients with advanced cancer metastasised to liver were administered RNAi delivered through lipid nanoparticles. The RNAi targeted two genes encoding key proteins in the growth of the cancer cells, vascular endothelial growth factor, (VEGF), and kinesin spindle protein (KSP). The results showed clinical benefits, with the cancer either stabilized after six months, or regression of metastasis in some of the patients. Pharmacodynamic analysis of biopsy samples from the patients revealed the presence of the RNAi constructs in the samples, proving that the molecules reached the intended target.

Proof of concept trials have indicated that Ebola-targeted siRNAs may be effective as post-exposure prophylaxis in humans, with 100% of non-human primates surviving a lethal dose of Zaire Ebolavirus, the most lethal strain.

=== Legal categorization and legal issues in a near future ===
Currently, siRNAs are chemically synthesized and are therefore legally categorized in the EU and the US as simple medicinal products. But as bioengineered siRNA (BERAs) are in development, these would be classified as biological medicinal products, at least in the EU. The development of the BERAs technology raises the question of the categorization of drugs having the same mechanism of action but being produced chemically or biologically. This lack of consistency should be addressed.

== Intracellular delivery ==
There is great potential for RNA interference (RNAi) to be used therapeutically to reversibly silence any gene. For RNAi to realize its therapeutic potential, small interfering RNA (siRNA) must be delivered to the site of action in the cells of target tissues. But finding safe and efficient delivery mechanisms is a major obstacle to achieving the full potential of siRNA-based therapies. Unmodified siRNA is unstable in the bloodstream, has the potential to cause immunogenicity, and has difficulty readily navigating cell membranes. As a result, chemical alterations and/or delivery tools are needed to safely transfer siRNA to its site of action.

The majority of approved agents use N-acetylgalactosamine (GalNAc) conjugation to achieve selective hepatocyte delivery via the asialoglycoprotein receptor (ASGPR), enabling subcutaneous administration. Patisiran (Onpattro), the first approved siRNA drug (2018), instead employs a lipid nanoparticle (LNP) formulation for intravenous delivery.

There are also a variety of technologies that may be potentially utilized foir of delivery for siRNA that differ on efficiency and toxicity.

=== Transfection ===
In this technique, siRNA must first be designed against the target gene. Once the siRNA is configured against the gene, it has to be effectively delivered through a transfection protocol. Delivery is usually done by cationic liposomes, polymer nanoparticles, and lipid conjugation. This method is advantageous because it can deliver siRNA to most types of cells, has high efficiency and reproducibility, and is offered commercially. The most common commercial reagents for transfection of siRNA are Lipofectamine and Neon Transfection. However, it is not compatible with all cell types and has low in vivo efficiency.

=== Electroporation ===
Electrical pulses are also used to intracellularly deliver siRNA into cells. The cell membrane is made of phospholipids which makes it susceptible to an electric field. When quick but powerful electrical pulses are initiated, the lipid molecules reorient themselves, while undergoing thermal phase transitions because of heating. This results in hydrophilic pores and localized perturbations in the lipid bilayer of the cell membrane, and temporary loss of semipermeability. This allows for the escape of intracellular contents (ions, metabolites, etc.) as well as for the uptake of drugs, molecular probes, and nucleic acids.

For cells that are difficult to transfect, electroporation is advantageous; however, cell death is more likely under this technique. The method has been used to deliver siRNA targeting VEGF into the xenografted tumors in nude mice, which resulted in a significant suppression of tumor growth.

=== Viral-mediated delivery ===
The gene silencing effects of transfected, designed siRNA are generally transient, but this difficulty can be overcome through an RNAi approach. Delivering this siRNA from DNA templates can be done through several recombinant viral vectors based on retrovirus, adeno-associated virus, adenovirus, and lentivirus. As of primary research work in 2006, the latter virus was the most efficient for stable delivery of siRNA to target cells, as it could be used to transduce nondividing cells, as well as to directly target the nucleus. These specific viral vectors have been synthesized to effectively facilitate siRNA that is not viable for transfection into cells.

In some cases synthetic viral vectors can integrate siRNA into the cell genome, which allows for stable expression of siRNA and long-term gene knockdown. This technique is advantageous because it is an in vivo method, and can be effective for difficult to transfect cells. However, problems arise because it can trigger antiviral responses in some cell types, leading to mutagenic and immunogenic effects.

This method has been shown to have potential for use in gene silencing of the central nervous system genes, e.g., in the treatment of Huntington's disease.

== Therapies ==
A decade after the discovery of the RNAi mechanism in 1998, the pharmaceutical sector heavily invested in the research and development of siRNA therapy. There are several advantages that this therapy has over small molecules and antibodies. It can be administered quarterly or every six months. Another advantage is that, unlike small molecules and monoclonal antibodies that need to recognize a specific protein conformation, siRNA functions by Watson-Crick basepairing with mRNA. Therefore, any target molecule that needs to be treated with high affinity and specificity can be selected if the right nucleotide sequence is available. One of the biggest challenges researchers needed to overcome was the identification and establishment of a delivery system through which the therapies would enter the body. Another was that the immune system often mistakes RNAi therapies for remnants of infectious agents, which can trigger an immune response. Animal models did not accurately represent the degree of immune response seen in humans, and despite the promise of the treatment, investors divested from RNAi.

However, there were a few companies that continued with the development of RNAi therapy for humans. Alnylam Pharmaceuticals, Sirna Therapeutics and Dicerna Pharmaceuticals are few of the companies still working on bringing RNAi therapies to market. It was learned that almost all siRNA therapies administered in the bloodstream accumulated in the liver. That is why most of the early drug targets were diseases that affected the liver. Repeated developmental work also shed light on improving the chemical composition of the RNA molecule to reduce the immune response, subsequently causing little to no side effects.

=== Alnylam Pharmaceuticals ===
In 2018, Alnylam Pharmaceuticals became the first company to have a siRNA therapy approved by the FDA. Onpattro (patisiran) was approved for the treatment of polyneuropathy of hereditary transthyretin-mediated (hATTR) amyloidosis in adults. hATTR is a rare, progressively debilitating condition. During hATTR amyloidosis, misfolded transthyretin (TTR) protein is deposited in the extracellular space. Under typical folding conditions, TTR tetramers are made up of four monomers. Hereditary ATTR amyloidosis is caused by a fault or mutation in the transthyretin (TTR) gene, which is inherited. Changing just one amino acid changes the tetrameric transthyretin proteins, resulting in unstable tetrameric transthyretin protein that aggregates in monomers and forms insoluble extracellular amyloid deposits. Amyloid buildup in various organ systems causes cardiomyopathy, polyneuropathy, and gastrointestinal dysfunction. It affects 50,000 people worldwide. To deliver the drug directly to the liver, siRNA is encased in a lipid nanoparticle. The siRNA molecule halts the production of amyloid proteins by interfering with the RNA production of abnormal TTR proteins. This prevents the accumulation of these proteins in different organs of the body and helps the patients manage this disease.

Traditionally, liver transplantation has been the standard treatment for hereditary transthyretin amyloidosis; however, its effectiveness may be limited by the persistent deposition of wild-type transthyretin amyloid after transplantation. There are also small-molecule medications that provide temporary relief. Before Onpattro was released, the treatment options for hATTR were limited. After the approval of Onpattro, the FDA awarded Alnylam with the Breakthrough Therapy Designation, which is given to drugs that are intended to treat a serious condition and are a substantial improvement over any available therapy. It was also awarded Orphan Drug Designations given to those treatments that are intended to safely treat conditions affecting fewer than 200,000 people.

Along with Onpattro, another RNA interference therapeutic drug, patisiran, has also been developed, which has the property of inhibiting hepatic synthesis of transthyretin. As a result, target messenger RNA (mRNA) is cleaved by small interfering RNAs coupled to the RNA-induced silencing complex. Patisiran, an RNAi therapeutic drug, uses this process to decrease the production of mutant and wild-type transthyretin by cleaving the 3' untranslated region of transthyretin mRNA.

In 2019, the FDA approved the second RNAi therapy, Givlaari (givosiran), used to treat acute hepatic porphyria (AHP). The disease is caused by the accumulation of toxic porphobilinogen (PBG) molecules, which are formed during the production of heme. These molecules accumulate in different organs, and this can lead to the symptoms or attacks of AHP.

Givlaari is an siRNA drug that downregulates the expression of aminolevulinic acid synthase 1 (ALAS1), a liver enzyme involved in an early step in heme production. The downregulation of ALAS1 lowers the levels of neurotoxic intermediates that cause AHP symptoms.

Years of research have led to a greater understanding of siRNA therapies beyond those affecting the liver. As of 2019, Alnylam Pharmaceuticals was involved in therapies that may treat amyloidosis and CNS disorders like Huntington's disease and Alzheimer's disease. They have also partnered with Regeneron Pharmaceuticals to develop therapies for CNS, eye, and liver diseases.

As of 2020, Onpattro and Givlaari were available for commercial application, and two siRNAs, lumasiran (ALN-GO1) and inclisiran, have been submitted for new drug application to the FDA. Several siRNAs are undergoing phase 3 clinical studies, and more candidates are in the early developmental stage. In 2020, Alnylam and Vir Pharmaceuticals announced a partnership and have started working on an RNAi therapy that would treat severe cases of COVID-19.

Other companies that have had success in developing a pipeline of siRNA therapies include Dicerna Pharmaceuticals, partnered with Eli Lilly and Company, and Arrowhead Pharmaceuticals, partnered with Johnson and Johnson. Several other large pharmaceutical companies, such as Amgen and AstraZeneca, have also invested heavily in siRNA therapies, seeing potential success in this area of biological drugs.

== See also ==
* RNA Interference
- Gene knockdown
- Gene silencing
- Oligonucleotide synthesis
- EsiRNA
- NatsiRNA
- Viroid
- VIRsiRNAdb
- CRISPR
- Dharmacon
- Persomics
