= Phillip D. Zamore =

American molecular biologist

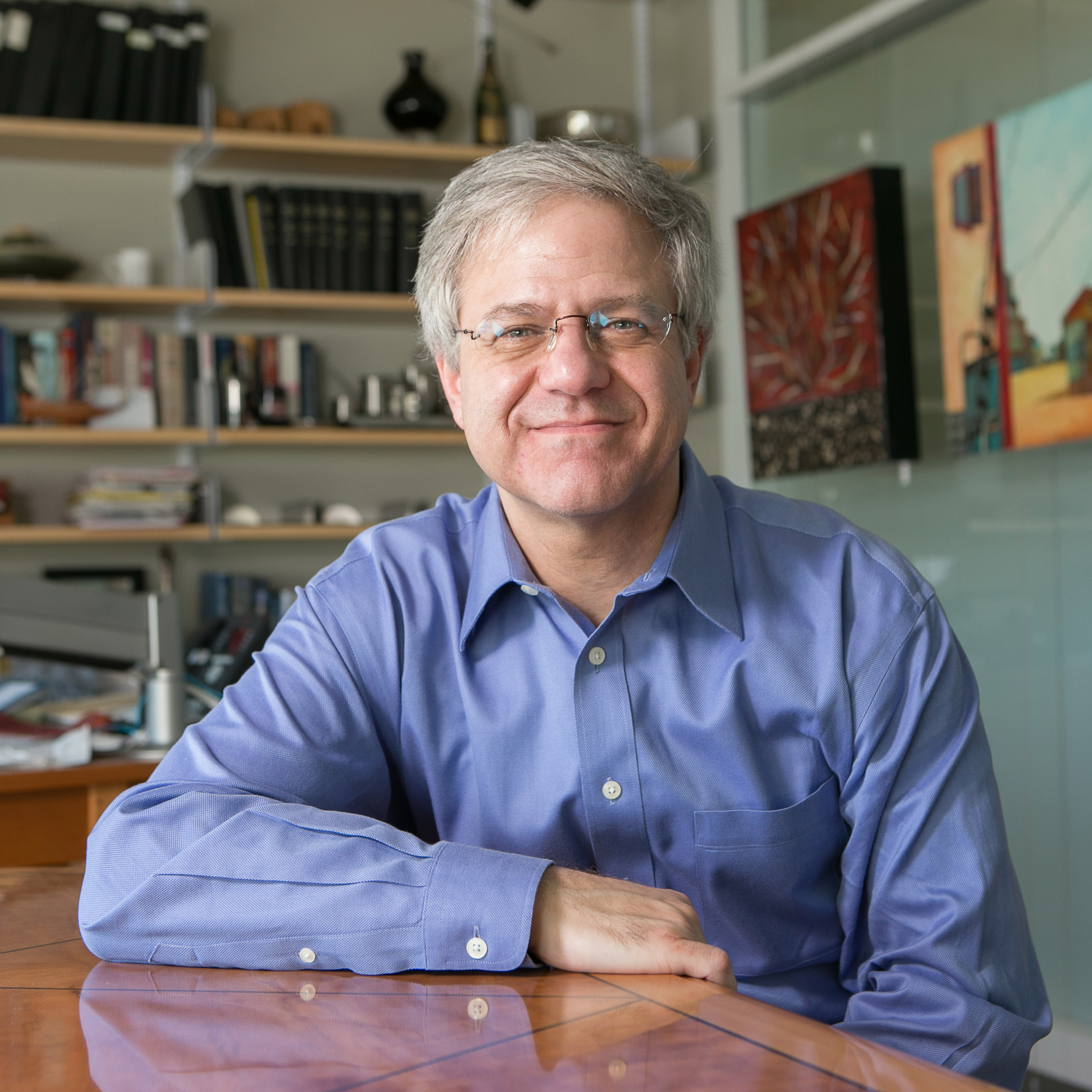
- Education: Harvard University, Whitehead Institute
- Known for: small RNA biology and therapeutics
- Scientific career
- Fields: Biochemistry, molecular biology
- Workplaces: McGill University, Howard Hughes Medical Institute
- Doctoral advisor: Michael R. Green
- Other academic advisors: Michael R. Green, Ruth Lehmann, David Bartel, and James R. Williamson
- Doctoral students: Yukihide Tomari, Zhao Zhang, Elif Sarinay Cenik
- Website: www.zamorelab.umassmed.edu

Phillip D. Zamore is an American molecular biologist and biochemist who co-developed the first in vitro system for studying the mechanism of RNA interference (RNAi). He is Eddie Goldenberg Research Chair of Canada in RNA Biology and Therapeutics at McGill University. Before joining McGill, he was the Gretchen Stone Cook Professor of Biomedical Sciences at University of Massachusetts Chan Medical School, Worcester, Massachusetts. Zamore is chair of the RNA Therapeutics Institute (RTI), established in 2009, and has been a Howard Hughes Medical Institute Investigator since 2008.

== Research ==
The Zamore lab seeks to understand the molecular mechanisms and biological functions of RNAi and related pathways in animals, including how small RNAs (microRNAs, small interfering RNAs, and PIWI-interacting RNAs) regulate gene expression and suppress transposons. In addition to a focus on basic research, the Zamore lab is working to develop novel nucleic acid-based drugs to treat human disease. Zamore has more than 60,000 citations on Google Scholar.

== Biography ==
Zamore received his A.B. in biochemistry and molecular biology from Harvard University in Cambridge, Massachusetts, in 1986 and continued graduate studies with Michael Green at Harvard, receiving his Ph.D. in 1992. After completing postdoctoral studies at The Whitehead Institute for Biomedical Research, MIT, and the Skirball Institute at New York University Medical Center with Ruth Lehmann, James R. Williamson, and David Bartel, Zamore began his academic career as an assistant professor in the Department of Biochemistry and Molecular Pharmacology in 1999 at UMass Medical School in Worcester, Massachusetts. A member of the National Academy of Sciences, the National Academy of Medicine, and the American Academy of Arts and Sciences, Zamore has trained 40 PhD and MD/PhD students and post-doctoral scholars.

== Involvement with biotechnology ==
Zamore's research has led to a career in biotechnology, co-founding Alnylam Pharmaceuticals in 2002. Alnylam is dedicated to bringing RNAi based therapies to market and developed the first-ever FDA approved RNAi drug, Patisiran, gaining FDA approval in August 2018. In 2014, Zamore co-founded another RNAi based company; Voyager Therapeutics, which focuses on developing therapeutics for neurodegenerative disorders.

== Selected awards and honors ==
- RNA Society / Cold Spring Harbor Laboratory Press Distinguished Research Mentor Award, 2024
- Member, National Academy of Medicine, 2023
- Member, National Academy of Sciences, 2023
- Fellow, American Academy of Arts and Sciences, 2023
- Invented Here! Honoree, Boston Patent Law Association, for US patent US 9,226,976, “RAAV- Based Compositions and Methods for Treating Alpha-1 Anti-Trypsin Deficiencies,” 2017
- Paper of the Year (Salomon et al., Cell 2015), Oligonucleotide Therapeutics Society
- Chancellor's Medal for Excellence in Scholarship, University of Massachusetts Medical School, 2014
- “The World’s Most Influential Scientific Minds 2014,” Molecular Biology & Genetics, Thomson-Reuters
- Top 20 Translational Researchers of 2014, Nature Biotechnology
- Fellow, National Academy of Inventors, 2014
- Outstanding Research Achievement, Nature Biotechnology SciCafé, 2009
- Schering-Plough Award, American Society of Biochemistry and Molecular Biology, 2009
- Most Highly Cited Researchers, 2002–2012 (Thomson-Reuters)
- W.M. Keck Foundation Young Scholar in Medical Research, 2002–2007
- Top 20 Most Highly Cited Researchers in Molecular Biology and Genetics, 2002–2006, ScienceWatch (Thomson Scientific)
- Pew Scholar in the Biomedical Sciences, 2000–2004

== Selected publications ==
- Hutvagner, G.; McLachlan, J.; Pasquinelli, A. E.; Bálint, E.; Tuschl, T.; Zamore, P. D. (2001). "A Cellular Function for the RNA-Interference Enzyme Dicer in the Maturation of the let-7 Small Temporal RNA". Science. 293 (5531): 834–838. doi:10.1126/science.1062961. hdl:11858/00-001M-0000-0012-F68D-9. PMID 11452083. S2CID 6177608.
- Hutvagner, G.; Zamore, P. D. (2002). "A microRNA in a Multiple-Turnover RNAi Enzyme Complex". Science. 297 (5589): 2056–2060. Bibcode:2002Sci...297.2056H. doi:10.1126/science.1073827. PMID 12154197. S2CID 16969059.
- Schwarz, Dianne S.; Hutvágner, György; Du, Tingting; Xu, Zuoshang; Aronin, Neil; Zamore, Phillip D. (2003). "Asymmetry in the Assembly of the RNAi Enzyme Complex". Cell. 115 (2): 199–208. doi:10.1016/S0092-8674(03)00759-1. PMID 14567917.
- Tomari, Yukihide; Du, Tingting; Haley, Benjamin; Schwarz, Dianne S.; Bennett, Ryan; Cook, Heather A.; Koppetsch, Birgit S.; Theurkauf, William E.; Zamore, Phillip D. (2004). "RISC Assembly Defects in the Drosophila RNAi Mutant armitage". Cell. 116 (6): 831–841. doi:10.1016/S0092-8674(04)00218-1. PMID 15035985.
- Vagin, V. V.; Sigova, A.; Li, C.; Seitz, H.; Gvozdev, V.; Zamore, P. D. (2006). "A Distinct Small RNA Pathway Silences Selfish Genetic Elements in the Germline". Science. 313 (5785): 320–324. Bibcode:2006Sci...313..320V. doi:10.1126/science.1129333. PMID 16809489. S2CID 40471466.
- Tomari, Yukihide; Du, Tingting; Zamore, Phillip D. (2007). "Sorting of Drosophila Small Silencing RNAs". Cell. 130 (2): 299–308. doi:10.1016/j.cell.2007.05.057. PMC 2841505. PMID 17662944.
- Difiglia, M.; Sena-Esteves, M.; Chase, K.; Sapp, E.; Pfister, E.; Sass, M.; Yoder, J.; Reeves, P.; Pandey, R. K.; Rajeev, K. G.; Manoharan, M.; Sah, D. W. Y.; Zamore, P. D.; Aronin, N. (2007). "Therapeutic silencing of mutant huntingtin with siRNA attenuates striatal and cortical neuropathology and behavioral deficits". Proceedings of the National Academy of Sciences. 104 (43): 17204–17209. Bibcode:2007PNAS..10417204D. doi:10.1073/pnas.0708285104. PMC 2040405. PMID 17940007.
- Ghildiyal, M.; Seitz, H.; Horwich, M. D.; Li, C.; Du, T.; Lee, S.; Xu, J.; Kittler, E. L.W.; Zapp, M. L.; Weng, Z.; Zamore, P. D. (2008). "Endogenous siRNAs Derived from Transposons and mRNAs in Drosophila Somatic Cells". Science. 320 (5879): 1077–1081. Bibcode:2008Sci...320.1077G. doi:10.1126/science.1157396. PMC 2953241. PMID 18403677.
- Ameres, S. L.; Horwich, M. D.; Hung, J.-H.; Xu, J.; Ghildiyal, M.; Weng, Z.; Zamore, P. D. (2010). "Target RNA-Directed Trimming and Tailing of Small Silencing RNAs". Science. 328 (5985): 1534–1539. Bibcode:2010Sci...328.1534A. doi:10.1126/science.1187058. PMC 2902985. PMID 20558712.
- Salomon, William E.; Jolly, Samson M.; Moore, Melissa J.; Zamore, Phillip D.; Serebrov, Victor (2015). "Single-Molecule Imaging Reveals that Argonaute Reshapes the Binding Properties of its Nucleic Acid Guides". Cell. 162 (1): 84–95. doi:10.1016/j.cell.2015.06.029. PMC 4503223. PMID 26140592.

== See also ==
- List of RNA biologists
