= Biological target =

Part of an organism targeted by a ligand or drug to affect behavior

A biological target is anything within a living organism to which some other entity (like an endogenous ligand or a drug) is directed and/or binds, resulting in a change in its behavior or function. Examples of common classes of biological targets are proteins and nucleic acids. The definition is context-dependent, and can refer to the biological target of a pharmacologically active drug compound, the receptor target of a hormone (like insulin), or some other target of an external stimulus. Biological targets are most commonly proteins such as enzymes, ion channels, and receptors, but in recent years DNA's and RNA's became more targeted than in the past.

== Mechanism ==
The external stimulus (i.e., the drug or ligand) physically binds to ("hits") the biological target. The interaction between the substance and the target may be:

- noncovalent – A relatively weak interaction between the stimulus and the target where no chemical bond is formed between the two interacting partners and hence the interaction is completely reversible.
- reversible covalent – A chemical reaction occurs between the stimulus and target in which the stimulus becomes chemically bonded to the target, but the reverse reaction also readily occurs in which the bond can be broken.
- irreversible covalent – The stimulus is permanently bound to the target through irreversible chemical bond formation.

Depending on the nature of the stimulus, the following can occur:

- There is no direct change in the biological target, but the binding of the substance prevents other endogenous substances (such as activating hormones) from binding to the target. Depending on the nature of the target, this effect is referred as receptor antagonism, enzyme inhibition, or ion channel blockade.
- A conformational change in the target is induced by the stimulus which results in a change in target function. This change in function can mimic the effect of the endogenous substance in which case the effect is referred to as receptor agonism (or channel or enzyme activation) or be the opposite of the endogenous substance which in the case of receptors is referred to as inverse agonism.

== Drug targets ==
The term "biological target" is frequently used in pharmaceutical research to describe the native protein in the body whose activity is modified by a drug resulting in a specific effect, which may be a desirable therapeutic effect or an unwanted adverse effect. In this context, the biological target is often referred to as a drug target. The most common drug targets of currently marketed drugs include:

- proteins
  - G protein-coupled receptors (target of 50% of drugs)
  - enzymes (especially protein kinases, proteases, esterases, and phosphatases)
  - ion channels
    - ligand-gated ion channels
    - voltage-gated ion channels
  - nuclear hormone receptors
  - structural proteins such as tubulin
  - membrane transport proteins
- nucleic acids

== Drug target identification ==
Identifying the biological origin of a disease, and the potential targets for intervention, is the first step in the discovery of a medicine using the reverse pharmacology approach. Potential drug targets are not necessarily disease causing but must by definition be disease modifying. An alternative means of identifying new drug targets is forward pharmacology based on phenotypic screening to identify "orphan" ligands whose targets are subsequently identified through target deconvolution.

== Databases ==
Databases containing biological targets information:

- Therapeutic Targets Database (TTD)
- DrugMap
- DrugBank
- Binding DB

== Conservation ecology ==
These biological targets are conserved across species, making pharmaceutical pollution of the environment a danger to species who possess the same targets. For example, the synthetic estrogen in human contraceptives, 17-R-ethinylestradiol, has been shown to increase the feminization of fish downstream from sewage treatment plants, thereby unbalancing reproduction and creating an additional selective pressure on fish survival. Pharmaceuticals are usually found at ng/L to low-μg/L concentrations in the aquatic environment. Adverse effects may occur in non-target species as a consequence of specific drug target interactions. Therefore, evolutionarily well-conserved drug targets are likely to be associated with an increased risk for non-targeted pharmacological effects.

== See also ==
- Drug discovery
- Environmental impact of pharmaceuticals and personal care products
