= Gene knockdown =

Genetic modification technique

Gene knockdown is an experimental technique by which the expression of one or more of an organism's genes is reduced. The reduction can occur either through genetic modification or by treatment with a reagent such as a short DNA or RNA oligonucleotide that has a sequence complementary to either gene or an mRNA transcript.

== Versus transient knockdown ==
If a DNA of an organism is genetically modified, the resulting organism is called a "knockdown organism." If the change in gene expression is caused by an oligonucleotide binding to an mRNA or temporarily binding to a gene, this leads to a temporary change in gene expression that does not modify the chromosomal DNA, and the result is referred to as a "transient knockdown".

In a transient knockdown, the binding of this oligonucleotide to the active gene or its transcripts causes decreased expression through a variety of processes. Binding can occur either through the blocking of transcription (in the case of gene-binding), the degradation of the mRNA transcript (e.g. by small interfering RNA (siRNA)) or RNase-H dependent antisense, or through the blocking of either mRNA translation, pre-mRNA splicing sites, or nuclease cleavage sites used for maturation of other functional RNAs, including miRNA (e.g. by morpholino oligos or other RNase-H independent antisense).

The most direct use of transient knockdowns is for learning about a gene that has been sequenced, but has an unknown or incompletely known function. This experimental approach is known as reverse genetics. Researchers draw inferences from how the knockdown differs from individuals in which the gene of interest is operational. Transient knockdowns are often used in developmental biology because oligos can be injected into single-celled zygotes and will be present in the daughter cells of the injected cell through embryonic development. The term gene knockdown first appeared in the literature in 1994

== RNA interference ==
RNA interference (RNAi) is a means of silencing genes by way of mRNA degradation. Gene knockdown by this method is achieved by introducing small double-stranded interfering RNAs (siRNA) into the cytoplasm. Small interfering RNAs can originate from inside the cell or can be exogenously introduced into the cell. Once introduced into the cell, exogenous siRNAs are processed by the RNA-induced silencing complex (RISC). The siRNA is complementary to the target mRNA to be silenced, and the RISC uses the siRNA as a template for locating the target mRNA. After the RISC localizes to the target mRNA, the RNA is cleaved by a ribonuclease.

RNAi is widely used as a laboratory technique for genetic functional analysis. RNAi in organisms such as Caenorhabditis elegans and Drosophila melanogaster provides a quick and inexpensive means of investigating gene function. In C. elegans research, the availability of tools such as the Ahringer RNAi Library give laboratories a way of testing many genes in a variety of experimental backgrounds. Insights gained from experimental RNAi use may be useful in identifying potential therapeutic targets, drug development, or other applications. RNA interference is a very useful research tool, allowing investigators to carry out large genetic screens in an effort to identify targets for further research related to a particular pathway, drug, or phenotype.

== CRISPRs ==
A different means of silencing exogenous DNA that has been discovered in prokaryotes is a mechanism involving loci called 'Clustered Regularly Interspaced Short Palindromic Repeats', or CRISPRs. CRISPR-associated (cas) genes encode cellular machinery that cuts exogenous DNA into small fragments and inserts them into a CRISPR repeat locus. When this CRISPR region of DNA is expressed by the cell, the small RNAs produced from the exogenous DNA inserts serve as a template sequence that other Cas proteins use to silence this same exogenous sequence. The transcripts of the short exogenous sequences are used as a guide to silence these foreign DNA when they are present in the cell. This serves as a kind of acquired immunity, and this process is like a prokaryotic RNA interference mechanism. The CRISPR repeats are conserved amongst many species and have been demonstrated to be usable in human cells, bacteria, C. elegans, zebrafish, and other organisms for effective genome manipulation. The use of CRISPRs as a versatile research tool can be illustrated by many studies making use of it to generate organisms with genome alterations.

== TALENs ==
Another technology made possible by prokaryotic genome manipulation is the use of transcription activator-like effector nucleases (TALENs) to target specific genes. TALENs are nucleases that have two important functional components: a DNA binding domain and a DNA cleaving domain. The DNA binding domain is a sequence-specific transcription activator-like effector sequence while the DNA cleaving domain originates from a bacterial endonuclease and is non-specific. TALENs can be designed to cleave a sequence specified by the sequence of the transcription activator-like effector portion of the construct. Once designed, a TALEN is introduced into a cell as a plasmid or mRNA. The TALEN is expressed, localizes to its target sequence, and cleaves a specific site. After cleavage of the target DNA sequence by the TALEN, the cell uses non-homologous end joining as a DNA repair mechanism to correct the cleavage. The cell's attempt at repairing the cleaved sequence can render the encoded protein non-functional, as this repair mechanism introduces insertion or deletion errors at the repaired site.

== Commercialization ==
So far, knockdown organisms with permanent alterations in their DNA have been engineered chiefly for research purposes. Also known simply as knockdowns, these organisms are most commonly used for reverse genetics, especially in species such as mice or rats for which transient knockdown technologies cannot easily be applied.

There are several companies that offer commercial services related to gene knockdown treatments.

== See also ==
- Gene knockout
