= Melissa J. Moore =

American biochemist, Chief Scientific Officer Emeritus, Moderna

- Born: New Market, Virginia, US
- Spouse: Janet Kosloff

Academic background
- Education: BS, Chemistry, 1984, College of William and Mary; PhD, Biological Chemistry, 1989, Massachusetts Institute of Technology
- Thesis: Mercuric ion reductase: mutagenesis of N- and C-terminal paired cysteines and initial crystallization studies (1989)
- Doctoral advisor: Christopher T. Walsh; Phillip Allen Sharp (postdoc)

Academic work
- Institutions: Moderna; University of Massachusetts Chan Medical School; Brandeis University

Melissa J. Moore is an American biochemist who focuses on RNA. She was the Chief Scientific Officer of Moderna from 2016-2023, where her team contributed to the development of the Moderna COVID-19 vaccine. In 2024 Moore was appointed to the Board of Directors of Chroma Medicine, a genomic medicine company.

== Early life and education ==
Moore was born and raised in New Market, Virginia, the youngest of four children. After graduating from the College of William and Mary with a Bachelor of Science degree in Chemistry and Biology, she earned her PhD in Biological Chemistry from the Massachusetts Institute of Technology in 1989. She wrote her thesis on "Mercuric ion reductase: mutagenesis of n- and c-terminal paired cysteines and initial crystallization studies". As a Helen Hay Whitney postdoctoral fellow under the supervision of Phillip Allen Sharp, she invented technology to join long RNA molecules, and published a seminal paper establishing the chemical mechanism of pre-mRNA splicing.

== Career ==
=== Brandeis University ===
Following her postdoctoral fellowship, Moore joined the faculty at Brandeis University in 1994, despite being recruited by Harvard University, Yale University, and Northwestern University. Soon after, she was named a Searle Scholar and Packard Fellow. At Brandeis, Moore established her own laboratory in the Biochemistry Department to research pre-mRNA splicing and its connections to intracellular mRNA localization, translation, and degradation. In 1997, she became a Howard Hughes Medical Institute Investigator, a position she retained for the following 19 years.

=== UMass Medical School ===
In 2007, Moore moved her research group to the Biochemistry and Molecular Pharmacology Department at the University of Massachusetts Chan Medical School (UMass Med). In 2011, Moore was the recipient of the American Society for Biochemistry and Molecular Biology's William C. Rose Award for excellence in mentoring. That year, Moore and her collaborator Ananth Karumanchi, also received a Bill and Melinda Gates Foundation Grand Challenges grant for their project "siRNA-based Therapeutics for Preeclampsia." They received a second grant in 2013 to refine the therapy and test it in baboons. That work stemmed from Moore's own experience as a preeclampsia survivor in 2003.

=== Moderna ===
In October 2016, Moore was appointed Chief Scientific Officer, Platform Research, at Moderna Therapeutics. While serving in this role, she was elected to the National Academy of Sciences, named a fellow in the American Academy of Arts and Sciences, and recognized with the 2021 RNA Society Lifetime Achievement in Science Award. During the COVID-19 pandemic, the work of Moore's team was instrumental in the development of the Moderna COVID-19 vaccine. In December 2020, she and other Moderna leaders addressed the Food and Drug Administration advisory panel to consider recommending emergency use authorization of the mRNA-1273 vaccine.

== Personal life ==
Moore is married to Janet Kosloff, a retired CEO and entrepreneur in the life science market research sector. They have three children.
