= UMass Chan Medical School =

Public medical school in Worcester, Massachusetts, US

University of Massachusetts Chan Medical School
- UMMS Logo
- Type: Public medical school
- Established: 1962
- Parent institution: University of Massachusetts
- Accreditation: NECHE
- Endowment: $207.5 million (2018)
- Chancellor: David D. McManus
- President: Marty Meehan
- Students: Medicine: 608; Biomedical Sciences: 306; Nursing: 192; MD/PhD: 78 (2019)
- Location: Worcester, Massachusetts, United States; 42.276815°N 71.762445°W
- Campus: Urban
- Colors: Blue, white and black
- Website: umassmed.edu

The UMass Chan Medical School is a public medical school in Worcester, Massachusetts. It is part of the University of Massachusetts system. It consists of three schools: the T.H. Chan School of Medicine, the Morningside Graduate School of Biomedical Sciences, and the Tan Chingfen Graduate School of Nursing. The school also operates a biomedical research enterprise and a range of public-service initiatives throughout the state.

== History ==
The University of Massachusetts Medical School (UMMS) was established by the 162nd Massachusetts General Court in 1962 to provide residents of the commonwealth an opportunity to study medicine at an affordable cost and to increase the number of primary-care physicians practicing in the commonwealth's under-served areas. The legislation was signed into law by Massachusetts governor John Volpe. The School of Medicine accepted its first class of 16 students in 1970. Six years later a 371-bed hospital opened on campus; the Graduate School of Biomedical Sciences opened in 1979, and the Graduate School of Nursing opened in 1986.

In 1998, the UMMS system of hospitals and clinics merged with Memorial Health Care to form UMass Memorial Health Care, the largest health-care provider in Central Massachusetts and clinical partner of UMMS.

In 2021, an unrestricted $175 million gift from the family of Hong Kong real estate developer Chan Tseng-hsi resulted in the name of the medical school, along with the biosciences and nursing schools, to be changed.

All offers of admission to biomedical graduate students for the 2025–2026 school year were rescinded due to federal research funding cuts by the second Trump administration.

=== Worcester Foundation for Biomedical Research ===
The research mission at UMMS was augmented in 1997 with the acquisition of the financially ailing Worcester Foundation for Biomedical Research, the Shrewsbury, Massachusetts institution where researchers developed the combined oral contraceptive pill during the early 1960s.

== Academics ==
=== School of Medicine ===
Accredited by the Liaison Committee on Medical Education, the T.H. Chan School of Medicine grants the MD degree to its graduates. With the exception of MD/PhD students, degree candidates were formerly required to be Massachusetts residents, a policy which has changed beginning with the entering class of 2016. Approximately 165 students enroll annually, and more than 4,350 students have received medical degrees from UMMS. The School of Medicine has gained a national reputation for its primary-care program and consistently ranks in the top 10 percent of schools in the annual U.S. News & World Report guide, "America's Best Graduate Schools". SCImago Journal Rank listed the university at No. 74 in the US and No. 248 globally. Over half of each graduating class enters primary-care residencies, a trend underscoring the school's founding mission, though that figure has decreased in recent years. In addition, a high number of graduates practice throughout the state. UMass Medical is also accredited by the New England Commission of Higher Education.

Academic rankings

Global
- ARWU: 151–200
- U.S. News & World Report: 251

=== Graduate School of Biomedical Sciences ===
The Morningside Graduate School of Biomedical Sciences (GSBS) is a PhD-granting program that trains scientists in a specialty area with a broad background in the basic medical sciences in preparation for conducting research with direct relevance to human disease. According to the GSBS website, the school offers students a multidisciplinary program of study, in which they have freedom of choice in curriculum and in the selection of mentors for their graduate-thesis research. Since the first class of seven students enrolled in 1979, more than 1000 students have earned PhDs from the GSBS.

=== Graduate School of Nursing ===
Since the opening of the Tan Chingfen Graduate School of Nursing (GSN) in 1986, more than 600 students have obtained a nursing master's, post-master's or doctoral degree from the school. The GSN prepares professional and advanced practice nurses, nurse scientists and educators as leaders in nursing and health-care delivery to diverse populations through education, research, practice and service (according to the GSN website).

== Research ==
UMass Chan researchers have made advances in a broad range of disease families, from HIV and infectious diseases to cancer, genetic disorders, diabetes and immune disease. UMMS faculty discovered the link between the immune system and type-1 diabetes, found the genetic cause underlying the third-most-common form of the muscular dystrophies, and established the fundamental difference between HIV and other retroviruses.

In the 1990s, UMMS Professor of Medicine Shan Lu, leader of the UMMS DNA-based flu vaccine efforts, worked to advance the development of a potential avian-flu vaccine. Lu's team has also been recognized for its work in the creation of an HIV vaccine, which in Phase I testing was found to generate antibody and T-cell responses in otherwise healthy people not infected with HIV. In 1998, UMMS researcher Craig Mello (an investigator at the Howard Hughes Medical Institute) and his colleague Andrew Fire (of Stanford University, then of the Carnegie Institution in Washington, D.C.) discovered RNA interference (RNAi). They demonstrated that small pieces of double-stranded RNA had interfered with the expression of a gene whose coding sequence of DNA was similar to that of the RNA they tested. Mello and Fire received the 2006 Nobel Prize in Physiology or Medicine for their discoveries related to RNA interference.

Federal and private research grants and contracts at UMCMS rose from about $2 million in 1977 to more than $322 million in 2022 an increase of over 16,000% over forty-five years.

=== The RNA Therapeutics Institute ===
The RNA Therapeutics Institute (RTI) is a research institute at the University of Massachusetts Chan Medical School focused on the study and development of RNA-based therapeutics. The RTI was founded in 2009 by Victor Ambros, Craig C. Mello, Melissa J. Moore, and Phillip D. Zamore and became an academic department in 2016. It is chaired by molecular biologist Phillip D. Zamore and vice-chaired by CRISPR biologist Erik J. Sontheimer. The RTI brings together basic scientists and clinicians to study RNA biology and to develop therapeutic approaches in which RNA serves as a target or therapeutic modality. RTI faculty include investigators who have received major scientific honors, including elected membership in the American Academy for Arts & Sciences, National Academy of Sciences, the National Academy of Medicine, and the National Academy of Inventors, as well as the recipient of the 2025 Else Kröner Fresenius Prize for Medical Research, awards from the RNA Society and the Gairdner Foundation, and appointments as Howard Hughes Medical Institute investigators.

=== MassBiologics ===
MassBiologics is the only publicly owned, non-profit FDA-licensed manufacturer of vaccine and other biologic products in the United States. First established in 1894, the University of Massachusetts Biologic Laboratory was re-established in 1997 by the Massachusetts legislature, and oversight was transferred from the Department of Public Health to UMMS.

In recent years, MassBiologics has been called upon to respond to the threat of SARS, avian flu, and rabies. MassBiologics has developed or collaborated on five "orphan products" over the past twenty years. MassBiologics continues to market its FDA-licensed Td (tetanus and diphtheria) vaccine, providing a substantial proportion of the U.S. requirement for this vaccine. MassBiologics participates in the discovery, production and clinical testing of monoclonal antibodies (including antibodies to Clostridioides difficile), antibodies now known as actoxumab and bezlotoxumab In 2005, the firm opened an $80 million facility for monoclonal-antibody production. Co-developed with Serum Institute of India, it invented a fast-acting anti-Rabies drug called Rabies Human Monoclonal Antibody (RMAb).

UMMS is extending its mission of public service through its Commonwealth Medicine initiative.

== Faculty ==
Notable faculty members include:

- Victor Ambros, Breakthrough Prize and Nobel Prize laureate for the discovery of microRNA
- Job Dekker, developer of the chromosome conformation capture method
- Katherine A. Fitzgerald, molecular biologist and virologist, finalist for the 2011 Vilcek Prize
- Craig C. Mello, Nobel Prize laureate for the discovery of RNA interference
- Phillip D. Zamore, biochemist, known for discoveries in small RNAs
- Erik J. Sontheimer, molecular biologist recognized for contributions to the study of CRISPR–Cas systems
- Anastasia Khvorova, RNA biochemist, 2025 Else Kröner Fresenius Prize for Medical Research recipient

== Affiliates and clinical partners ==
The hospital and clinical components of UMMS are part of UMass Memorial Health Care (UMMHC). UMass Memorial is a multibillion-dollar health-care system consisting of acute-care hospitals, ambulatory clinics and a network of primary care physicians and specialists throughout central Massachusetts. With approximately 13,000 employees (including 1,500 physicians), UMMHC is the largest health-care provider in central Massachusetts. Its flagship hospital (UMass Memorial Medical Center) straddles three campuses along Route 9 in Worcester, Massachusetts and one in Marlborough, Massachusetts and is designated by the American College of Surgeons as a Level I Trauma Center.

Its largest publicly funded affiliate in the field of cancer research is the Quality Assurance Review Center (QARC), located in Lincoln, Rhode Island. Supported by the National Cancer Institute (NCI) and the National Institutes of Health (NIH), QARC receives radiotherapy data from around 1,000 hospitals in the United States.

UMMHC also maintains four community hospitals:

- Clinton Hospital in Clinton
- HealthAlliance Hospital in Fitchburg and Leominster
- Milford Regional Medical Center in Milford
- Harrington Hospital in Southbridge

== Campus ==
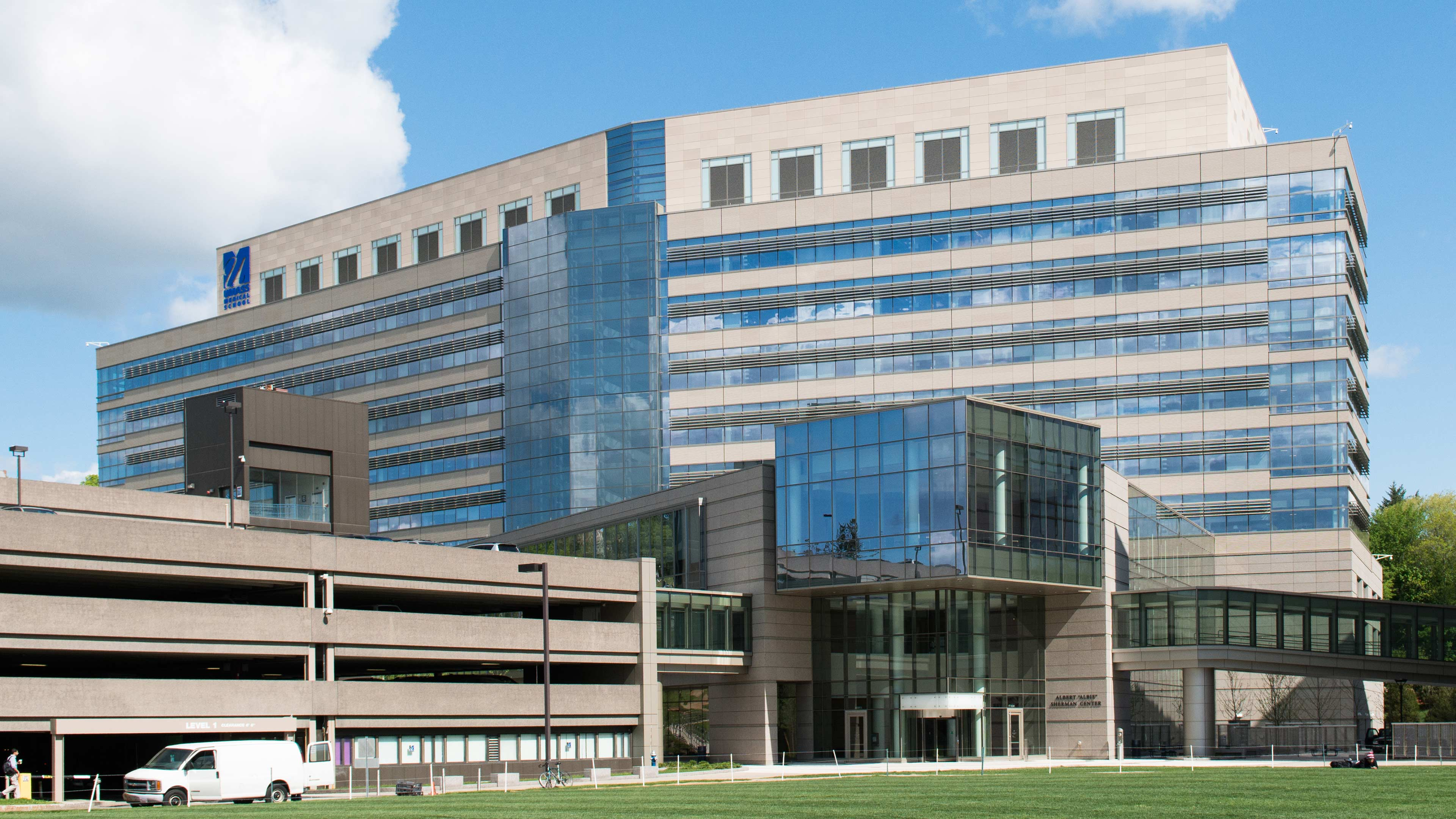
Albert Sherman Center

=== Albert Sherman Center ===
The Albert Sherman Center, a 512,000 square foot biomedical research and education facility, was unveiled to the public on January 30, 2013, in a ribbon-cutting ceremony attended by Gov. Deval Patrick.

=== Lamar Soutter Library ===
Named in honor of Lamar Soutter (founding dean of the School of Medicine), the Lamar Soutter Library at UMMS contains more than 288,000 volumes and is the state's leading source of biomedical information for inter‑library loan. The only public medical library in the state, it is the regional medical library for New England and one of eight regional libraries comprising the National Library of Medicine.

=== Aaron Lazare Medical Research Building ===
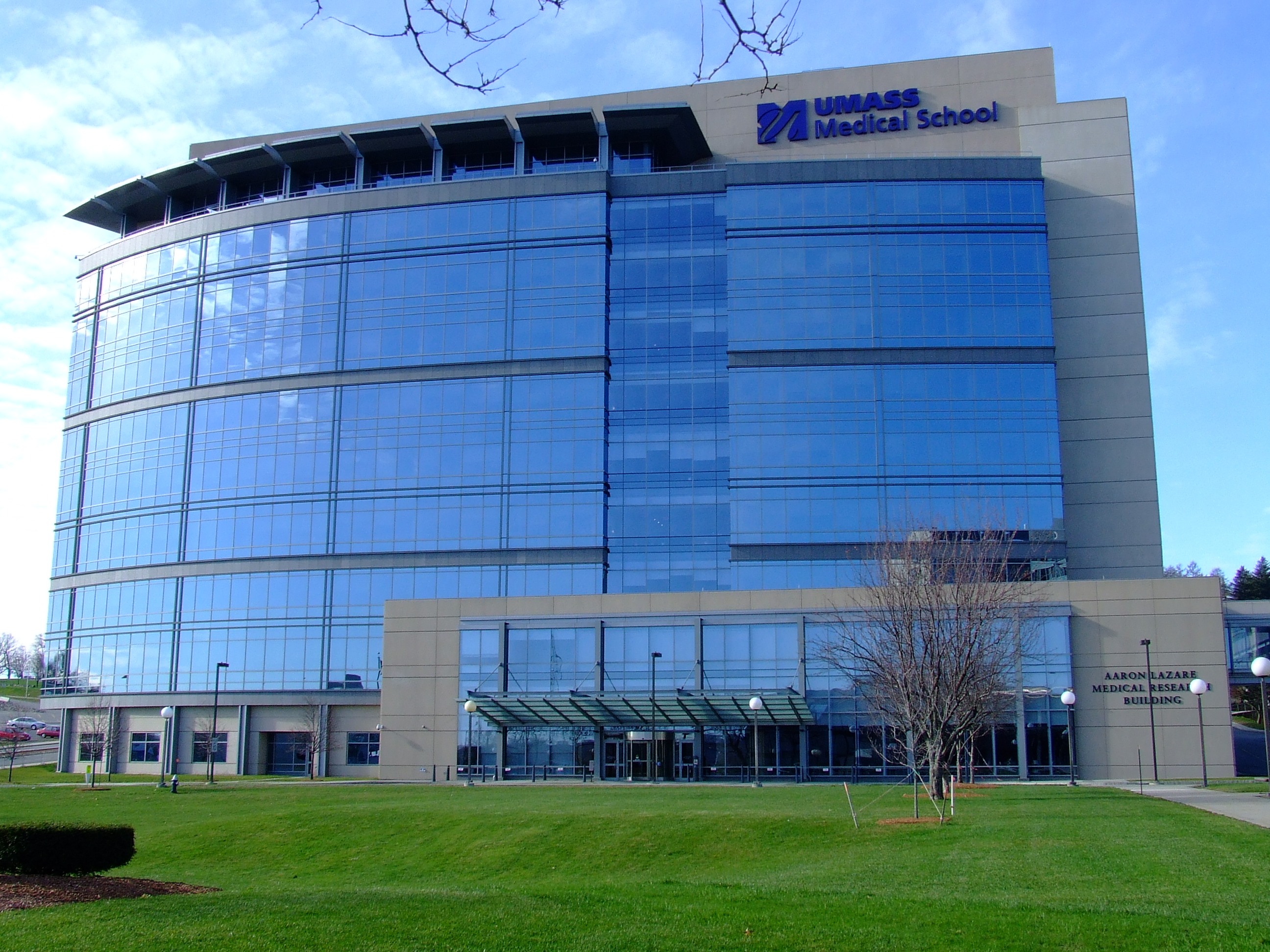
Aaron Lazare Medical Research Building

To support the more than 260 investigators working on advancements in the treatment of disease and injury, the Aaron Lazare Medical Research Building (a 360,000-square-foot (33,000 m^{2}) research facility) opened in October 2001. The 10-story structure, named for the chancellor emeritus, expanded upon the medical school's existing 600,000 square feet (60,000 m^{2}) of campus buildings and 83,000 square feet (7,700 m^{2}) in the adjacent Massachusetts Biotechnology Research Park.

=== Extended campus ===
The UMMS extended campus includes the Brudnick Neuropsychiatric Research Institute, labs and offices in the Massachusetts Biotechnology Research Park in Worcester; sites in Shrewsbury and Auburn; the Eunice Kennedy Shriver Center in Waltham and the New England Newborn Screening Program and Massachusetts Biologic Laboratories in Jamaica Plain and Mattapan.

== See also ==
- UMass Memorial Health Care
