= RNA activation =

Biological gene-regulation phenomenon

RNA activation (RNAa) is a small RNA-guided and Argonaute (Ago)-dependent gene regulation phenomenon in which promoter-targeted short double-stranded RNAs (dsRNAs) induce target gene expression at the transcriptional/epigenetic level. RNAa was first reported in a 2006 PNAS paper by Li et al. who also coined the term "RNAa" as a contrast to RNA interference (RNAi) to describe such gene activation phenomenon. dsRNAs that trigger RNAa have been termed small activating RNA (saRNA). Unlike RNAi, where small RNAs typically lead to gene silencing, RNAa demonstrates that small RNAs can also act as activators of gene expression.

== History and discovery ==
RNAa was first reported in 2006 by Long-Cheng Li and colleagues at University of California, San Francisco (UCSF). They demonstrated that synthetic dsRNAs, termed saRNAs, could target gene promoters and induce potent and sustained upregulation of gene expression in human cells. This discovery challenged the prevailing view of small RNAs as solely negative regulators of gene expression. The Li group coined the term "small activating RNA" (saRNA) to distinguish these RNAs from those that mediate gene silencing.

Shortly after, in 2007, Janowski et al. independently confirmed RNAa, showing that dsRNAs could activate the expression of the progesterone receptor gene. Subsequent research revealed that endogenous miRNAs, traditionally known for gene silencing, could also activate gene expression through a process termed miRNA-mediated RNAa (mi-RNAa). Since the initial discovery of RNAa in human cells, many other groups have made similar observations in different mammalian species including human, non-human primates, rat and mice; plant and C. elegans.

== Mechanisms of RNAa ==
The molecular mechanism of RNAa is not fully understood. Similar to RNAi, it has been shown that mammalian RNAa requires members of the Ago clade of Argonaute proteins, particularly Ago2, but possesses kinetics distinct from RNAi, characterized by a delayed onset and sustained activity over multiple cell divisions. In contrast to RNAi, promoter-targeted saRNAs induce prolonged activation of gene expression associated with epigenetic changes.

=== saRNA-mediated RNAa and the RITA Complex ===
The mechanism of saRNA-mediated RNAa centers around the RNA-induced transcriptional activation (RITA) complex. This complex includes:

- Argonaute 2 (AGO2): AGO2 binds to the guide strand of the saRNA and facilitates targeting to the gene promoter. AGO2 is the primary Argonaute protein involved in saRNA-mediated RNAa.
- RNA Helicase A (RHA): RHA is thought to unwind the DNA helix, allowing the saRNA to bind to its target sequence.
- CTR9 (Component of the PAF1 Complex): CTR9, a key part of the PAF1 complex (PAF1C), is recruited to the promoter. PAF1C plays a crucial role in regulating RNA Polymerase II (RNAP II) activity.

The RITA complex assembly at the target gene promoter leads to a shift in the transcriptional machinery, promoting the transition from paused to elongating RNAP II. This is evidenced by changes in phosphorylation patterns at the transcriptional start site (TSS): a decrease in Ser5-phosphorylated RNAP II (pausing) and an increase in Ser2-phosphorylated RNAP II (elongating). Histone H2B monoubiquitination is also an early epigenetic event associated with RNAa, promoting further histone modifications that enhance active transcription.

=== miRNA-mediated RNAa (mi-RNAa) ===
Endogenous miRNAs, typically known for their role in post-transcriptional gene silencing, can also activate gene expression. The mechanisms of mi-RNAa are diverse. Several models have been proposed:

- Release of Paused RNAP II: miR-34a, for example, has been shown to bind to a long non-coding RNA (lncRNA) transcribed from the ZMYND10 promoter. This interaction recruits the RNA-induced silencing complex (RISC), which then forms a complex with DDX21 and CDK9 (components of the positive transcription elongation factor b, P-TEFb). This complex facilitates the release of paused RNAP II at the promoter, allowing for active transcription.
- TATA Box Targeting: Some miRNAs including those encoded by HIV-1 virus and human endogenous ones have been shown to directly target the TATA box motif in gene promoters to facilitate pre-initiation complexes (PICs) assembly and transcription initiation.
- Targeting of RNA Transcripts: Some miRNAs can bind to RNA transcripts that overlap with the promoter.
- DNA Triplex Formation: miRNAs can directly bind double-stranded DNA (dsDNA) at purine-rich sequences, forming triple-helical structures that upregulate gene expression. This interaction, identified through biophysical methods and the computational algorithm Trident, suggests a novel mechanism of miRNA-mediated gene activation. Argonaute proteins may stabilize these miRNA-DNA triplexes.

=== Nuclear Import ===
A critical aspect of RNAa is the nuclear import of saRNAs and miRNAs. While the exact mechanisms are still under investigation, several pathways have been implicated:

- Importin-8: Importin-8 has been shown to mediate the nuclear import of mature miRNAs.
- AGO2-dependent transport: AGO2 itself may play a role in the nuclear localization of saRNAs.

== Conservation of RNAa ==
RNAa has been observed in a wide range of organisms, suggesting its evolutionary conservation and fundamental biological importance. It has been documented in:

- Mammals: RNAa has been demonstrated in cells from humans, non-human primates, mice, and rats.
- C. elegans: In C. elegans, the Argonaute protein CSR-1, along with its 22G-RNA cofactors, is required for chromosome segregation and counteracts epigenetic silencing to promote gene expression.
- Plants: In plants, RNA-directed DNA methylation (RdDM) can induce transcriptional activation, creating heritable epialleles.
- Insects: RNAa has been demonstrated in insects, where it can be used to activate both endogenous and exogenous genes.
- Ticks: RNAa has been shown to regulate endochitinase genes in ticks.

== Applications ==
=== As a Research Tool ===
RNAa has been used as a convenient tool by many scientists to study gene function in lieu of vector-based gene overexpression.

=== Therapeutic Applications ===
RNAa offers promising therapeutic potential because of its ability to increase gene expression. This provides a different approach for treating diseases caused by gene underexpression or loss-of-function mutations. saRNAs for a number of genes have been tested in various cell and animal disease models for therapeutic efficacy.

- Cancer: saRNAs have been used to reactivate tumor suppressor genes, inhibit cancer cell proliferation, and reduce tumor growth in animal models.
- Metabolic Disorders: saRNAs have been used to upregulate the expression of SIRT1, showing potential for reversing metabolic syndrome, and obesity.
- Cardiovascular Disorders: saRNAs targeting VEGFA gene in the form of shRNA have been tested for the treatment of peripheral artery disease and myocardial infarction. and erectile dysfunction (ED). saRNA-mediated activation of βII spectrin alleviated ischemia/reperfusion (I/R)-induced cardiac contractile dysfunction.
- Genetic and Neuromuscular Disorders: The application of RNAa has been investigated for Myotonic Dystrophy type 1 (DM1), a dominant inherited neuromuscular disorder. The core pathology of DM1 involves a toxic gain-of-function from expanded CUG repeats in the DMPK gene, which sequester Muscleblind-like (MBNL) proteins. This leads to a functional MBNL1 deficiency and a resulting disease-causing spliceopathy. In a study, saRNAs were designed to target the promoter of the MBNL1 gene. The saRNAs were shown to increase MBNL1 transcription and protein levels (approximately 1.5–3 fold) in various cell models, including those derived from DM1 patients. Critically, this upregulation of endogenous MBNL1 was sufficient to correct or significantly mitigate key molecular defects, such as the mis-splicing of the insulin receptor (INSR), a primary biomarker for DM1. The study provided a strong preclinical proof-of-concept for RNAa as a therapeutic strategy to address the root cause of DM1 and offered key engineering principles for future saRNA design.
- Neurodegenerative Disease: saRNAs targeting the BACE2 gene have been used to reduce Abeta production.
- Other Therapeutic Applications: saRNAs have been tested in several other disease models, including acute lung injury (ALI)/acute respiratory distress syndrome (ARDS) and proliferative vitreoretinopathy (PVR).

== Clinical Progress ==
Several saRNA therapeutics have entered clinical trials:

- MTL-CEBPA: This saRNA targets the C/EBPα gene and is being evaluated for the treatment of advanced liver cancer. Early clinical trials showed that MTL-CEBPA was well-tolerated and demonstrated signs of clinical activity.

== See also ==
- RNA interference
- Small activating RNA
- MicroRNA
- RNA-induced silencing complex
- Gene expression
- Gene silencing
- Epigenetics
- RNA-directed DNA methylation
