= Reverse pharmacology =

Drug discovery by identifying protein targets

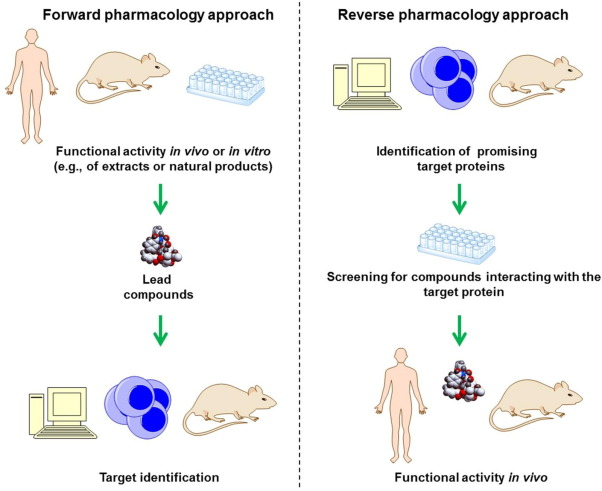
Forward and reverse pharmacology approaches in drug discovery

In the field of drug discovery, reverse pharmacology also known as target-based drug discovery (TDD), a hypothesis is first made that modulation of the activity of a specific protein target thought to be disease modifying will have beneficial therapeutic effects. Screening of chemical libraries of small molecules is then used to identify compounds that bind with high affinity to the target. The hits from these screens are then used as starting points for drug discovery. This method became popular after the sequencing of the human genome which allowed rapid cloning and synthesis of large quantities of purified proteins. This method is the most widely used in drug discovery today. Differently than the classical (forward) pharmacology, with the reverse pharmacology approach in vivo efficacy of identified active (lead) compounds is usually performed in the final drug discovery stages.

== See also ==
- Classical pharmacology
- Reverse vaccinology
