= Northeastern Huskies men's basketball statistical leaders =

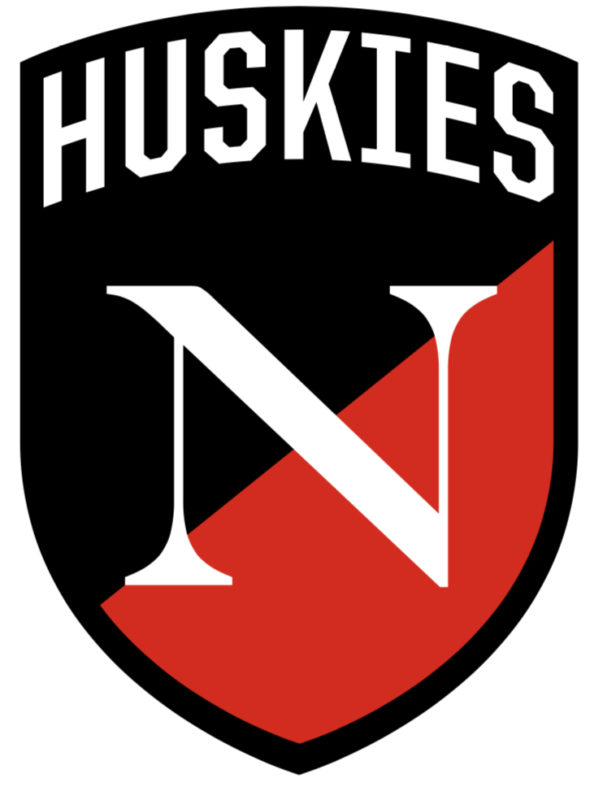

The Northeastern Huskies men's basketball statistical leaders are individual statistical leaders of the Northeastern Huskies men's basketball program in various categories, including points, three-pointers, assists, blocks, rebounds, and steals. Within those areas, the lists identify single-game, single-season, and career leaders. The Huskies represent Northeastern University in the NCAA's Colonial Athletic Association.

Northeastern began competing in intercollegiate basketball in 1920. However, the school's record book does not generally list records from before the 1950s, as records from before this period are often incomplete and inconsistent. Since scoring was much lower in this era, and teams played much fewer games during a typical season, it is likely that few or no players from this era would appear on these lists anyway.

The NCAA did not officially record assists as a stat until the 1983–84 season, and blocks and steals until the 1985–86 season, but Northeastern's record books includes players in these stats before these seasons. These lists are updated through the end of the 2020–21 season.

== Scoring ==
Career
Rk	Player	Points	Seasons
1	Reggie Lewis	2709	1983–84 1984–85 1985–86 1986–87
2	J. J. Barea	2290	2002–03 2003–04 2004–05 2005–06
3	Pete Harris	2167	1977–78 1978–79 1979–80 1980–81
4	Matt Janning	1836	2006–07 2007–08 2008–09 2009–10
5	Perry Moss	1722	1978–79 1979–80 1980–81 1981–82
6	Dave Caligaris	1673	1974–75 1975–76 1976–77 1977–78
7	Mark Halsel	1651	1980–81 1981–82 1982–83 1983–84
8	David Walker	1631	2012–13 2013–14 2014–15 2015–16
9	Quincy Ford	1617	2011–12 2012–13 2013–14 2014–15 2015–16
	John Clark	1617	1972–73 1973–74 1974–75 1975–76

Season
Rk	Player	Points	Season
1	Reggie Lewis	748	1984–85
2	Jordan Roland	722	2019–20
3	Reggie Lewis	714	1985–86
4	Perry Moss	710	1981–82
5	Reggie Lewis	676	1986–87
6	Mark Halsel	673	1983–84
7	J. J. Barea	665	2004–05
8	T. J. Williams	642	2016–17
9	Dave Caligaris	640	1977–78
10	J. J. Barea	610	2005–06

Single game
Rk	Player	Points	Season	Opponent
1	Jordan Roland	42	2019–20	Harvard
2	J. J. Barea	41	2004–05	Stony Brook
	Reggie Lewis	41	1985–86	Siena
4	Bolden Brace	40	2016–17	Elon
5	Jordan Roland	39	2019–20	Boston University
	Dave Caligaris	39	1977–78	Delaware
	Reggie Lewis	39	1985–86	Boston University
	Mal Henry	39	1944–45	AIC
9	Rashad King	39	2026–27	Butler
	Jordan Roland	38	2019–20	UNCW
	J. J. Barea	38	2002–03	Maine
	Bill Colby	38	1956–57	Clark
	Reggie Lewis	38	1984–85	Canisius

== Rebounds ==
Career
Rk	Player	Rebounds	Seasons
1	Mark Halsel	1115	1980–81 1981–82 1982–83 1983–84
2	Dan Callahan	1007	1990–91 1991–92 1992–93 1993–94 1994–95
3	Reggie Lewis	964	1983–84 1984–85 1985–86 1986–87
4	Chip Rucker	911	1977–78 1978–79 1979–80 1980–81
5	Steve Carney	871	1987–88 1988–89 1989–90 1990–91
6	Kevin McDuffie	805	1984–85 1985–86 1986–87 1987–88
7	Ward Sears	795	1959–60 1960–61 1961–62
8	Fran Ryan	762	1961–62 1962–63 1963–64
9	Bennet Davis	757	2003–04 2004–05 2005–06 2006–07
10	Wes Fuller	754	1983–84 1984–85 1985–86 1986–87

Season
Rk	Player	Rebounds	Season
1	Dan Callahan	364	1994–95
2	Steve Carney	356	1990–91
3	Mark Halsel	350	1982–83
4	Dan Callahan	340	1992–93
5	Mark Halsel	335	1981–82
6	Mark Halsel	328	1983–84
7	Scott Eatherton	327	2013–14
8	Reggie Lewis	279	1985–86
9	Chris Doherty	268	2021–22
10	Chip Rucker	260	1979–80

Single game
Rk	Player	Rebounds	Season	Opponent
1	Fran Ryan	24	1963–64	Boston College
2	Steve Carney	23	1987–88	Hartford
3	Dan Callahan	22	1993–94	George Mason
4	Dick Brooks	21	1992–93	Springfield
	Dan Callahan	21	1994–95	New Hampshire
	Dan Callahan	21	1994–95	Vermont

== Assists ==
Career
Rk	Player	Assists	Seasons
1	Andre LaFleur	894	1983–84 1984–85 1985–86 1986–87
2	J. J. Barea	721	2002–03 2003–04 2004–05 2005–06
3	Bill Loughnane	500	1976–77 1977–78 1978–79 1979–80
4	Chaisson Allen	430	2007–08 2008–09 2009–10 2010–11
5	David Walker	420	2012–13 2013–14 2014–15 2015–16
6	T. J. Williams	403	2013–14 2014–15 2015–16 2016–17
7	John Clark	379	1972–73 1973–74 1974–75 1975–76
8	Matt Janning	352	2006–07 2007–08 2008–09 2009–10
9	Pete Harris	325	1977–78 1978–79 1979–80 1980–81
10	Jean Bain	320	1998–99 1999–00 2000–01 2001–02

Season
Rk	Player	Assists	Season
1	Andre LaFleur	252	1983–84
2	J. J. Barea	244	2005–06
3	Andre LaFleur	232	1986–87
4	J. J. Barea	218	2004–05
5	Andre LaFleur	208	1984–85
6	Andre LaFleur	202	1985–86
7	George Robinson	181	1990–91
8	Vasa Pusica	168	2017–18
9	T. J. Williams	158	2016–17
10	J. J. Barea	150	2003–04

Single game
Rk	Player	Assists	Season	Opponent
1	Bill Loughnane	15	1977–78	Delaware
2	J. J. Barea	14	2005–06	CCSU
	J. J. Barea	14	2004–05	Hartford
	J. J. Barea	14	2003–04	UMBC
	George Robinson	14	1989–90	LMU
6	Rashad King	13	2024–25	Princeton
	David Walker	13	2015–16	Hofstra
	Jamaar Walker	13	2002–03	Vermont
	Lamont Hough	13	1991–92	UNH
	Halim Abdullah	13	1990–91	George Mason
	Andre LaFleur	13	1983–84	Vermont

== Steals ==
Career
Rk	Player	Steals	Seasons
1	Andre LaFleur	252	1983–84 1984–85 1985–86 1986–87
2	Chaisson Allen	232	2007–08 2008–09 2009–10 2010–11
3	Reggie Lewis	226	1983–84 1984–85 1985–86 1986–87
4	Perry Moss	197	1978–79 1979–80 1980–81 1981–82
5	Marcus Blossom	183	1997–98 1998–99 1999–00 2000–01
6	Quincy Ford	180	2011–12 2012–13 2013–14 2014–15 2015–16
	David Walker	180	2012–13 2013–14 2014–15 2015–16
	Ben Harlee	180	1990–91 1991–92 1992–93 1993–94 1994–95
9	J. J. Barea	178	2002–03 2003–04 2004–05 2005–06
10	Wes Fuller	175	1983–84 1984–85 1985–86 1986–87

Season
Rk	Player	Steals	Season
1	Andre LaFleur	89	1986–87
2	Reggie Lewis	84	1985–86
3	Wes Fuller	77	1986–87
4	Ron Lacey	71	1990–91
	Andre LaFleur	71	1985–86
6	Shawn Occeus	64	2017–18
7	Chaisson Allen	63	2007–08
8	Chaisson Allen	61	2010–11
	Reggie Lewis	61	1984–85
10	Quincy Ford	60	2011–12
	Marcus Blossom	69	2000–01
	Ben Harlee	60	1991–92
	Ben Harlee	60	1994–95

Single game
Rk	Player	Steals	Season	Opponent
1	Andre LaFleur	9	1986–87	Maine
2	Marcus Blossom	8	1998–99	Navy
3	Chaisson Allen	7	2007–08	Maryland
	Marcus Blossom	7	1999–00	Maine
	Omar Lee	7	1991–92	Fairleigh Dickinson
	Andre LaFleur	7	1986–87	Canisius

== Blocks ==
Career
Rk	Player	Blocks	Seasons
1	Shawn James	332	2004–05 2005–06
2	Bennet Davis	170	2003–04 2004–05 2005–06 2006–07
3	Reggie Lewis	155	1983–84 1984–85 1985–86 1986–87
4	Nkem Ojougboh	121	2007–08 2008–09 2009–10
5	Quincy Ford	113	2011–12 2012–13 2013–14 2014–15 2015–16
6	Collin Metcalf	107	2022–23 2023–24 2024–25
7	Scott Eatherton	100	2013–14 2014–15
8	Dan Callahan	98	1990–91 1991–92 1992–93 1993–94 1994–95
9	Steve Carney	96	1987–88 1988–89 1989–90 1990–91
10	Sylbrin Robinson	83	2001–02 2002–03 2003–04

Season
Rk	Player	Blocks	Season
1	Shawn James	196	2005–06
2	Shawn James	136	2004–05
3	Collin Metcalf	78	2024–25
4	Nkem Ojougboh	77	2009–10
5	Bennet Davis	67	2006–07
	Reggie Lewis	67	1985–86
7	Scott Eatherton	57	2013–14
8	Steve Carney	51	1990–91
9	Bennet Davis	44	2004–05
	Sylbrin Robinson	44	2002–03

Single game
Rk	Player	Blocks	Season	Opponent
1	Shawn James	11	2005–06	James Madison
	Shawn James	11	2004–05	Albany
	Shawn James	11	2004–05	Iona
4	Shawn James	10	2004–05	Maine
	Shawn James	10	2005–06	CS Northridge
	Shawn James	10	2005–06	Hofstra
	Shawn James	10	2005–06	VCU
	Shawn James	10	2005–06	Delaware
9	Shawn James	7	2004–05	Harvard
	Shawn James	7	2004–05	Memphis
	Bennet Davis	7	2006–07	UNC Wilmington
	Collin Metcalf	7	2024–25	Monmouth
