= The Phoenix – S K Club =

Final club at Harvard College, US

- Founded: 1895; 131 years ago Harvard College
- Type: Final club
- Affiliation: Independent
- Status: Active
- Scope: Local
- Chapters: 1
- Nickname: The Phoenix, The P.S.K.
- Headquarters: 72 Mt. Auburn Street; Cambridge, Massachusetts 02138; United States

The Phoenix – S K Club is an all-male final club at Harvard College, sometimes referred to as The Phoenix or The P.S.K. The society traces its earliest roots to 1895, forming from the amalgamation and reorganization of the Sphinx, Kalumet, and Phoenix Clubs. The Phoenix – S K clubhouse is located at 72 Mt. Auburn Street in Cambridge.

== History ==
The Phoenix – S K Club is an all-male final club at Harvard College that formed from the amalgamation and reorganization of the Phoenix, Sphinx, and Kalumet clubs.

=== Phoenix Club ===
The Phoenix Club was formed in 1902 by a group of men who were members of Theta Nu Epsilon, a national sophomore society formed as an offshoot of Yale University's Skull and Bones. The Alpha Iota chapter of Theta Nu Epsilon at Harvard College was chartered in 1895. The members of T.N.E. organized the Phoenix Club for residential and dining purposes, yet still maintained ties as the Alpha Iota chapter to the rest of the society until 1913 when there was a division in that society. It is not known when members of the Phoenix Club ceased to meet as members of Theta Nu Epsilon.

Starting in 1902, the Phoenix Club occupied a series of houses, starting with the John Hicks House at 64 Dunster Street, then in 1906 it moved to 97 Mt. Auburn Street, then in 1920 it moved again to the northeast corner of Winthrop and Holyoke Streets.

=== Sphinx Club ===
The Sphinx Club grew out of a small secret society founded in 1897. Originally known by several names, in 1900, almost all the members of this organization joined together to form the Sphinx Club, located at 1172 Massachusetts Avenue, then 55 Mt. Auburn Street. In 1903, the Club moved to 72 Mt. Auburn Street, the current site of the Phoenix—S K Club.

=== Kalumet Club ===
The Kalumet Club was started by members of the Harvard chapter of Beta Theta Pi, Many in the class of 1900, occupied a small house on the current Harvard Lampoon building site on Mt. Auburn Street. In 1900, the Club was formally organized as the Kalumet Club and moved to 1178 Massachusetts Avenue. In 1901 it moved to 104 Mt. Auburn Street, then three years later it moved again to 44 Church Street, where it remained until its amalgamation with the Sphinx in 1914.

=== S K Club ===
The adoption of the Inter-Club Agreement and other conditions made the union of these two Clubs desirable, so in 1914, members of both clubs voted that their undergraduate memberships should join the new S K Club. Construction was begun on a new clubhouse on the site of the Sphinx house at 72 Mt. Auburn Street, and the Kalumet house was employed in the meantime. The new building formally opened on April 1, 1916.

=== The Phoenix – S K Club ===
In 1925, negotiations for the amalgamation of the Phoenix and the S K were started, and in January 1925, undergraduate bodies of both clubs voted their approval. A new club, The Phoenix – S K, was formed, which occupied the S K clubhouse at 72 Mt. Auburn Street. With time, due to changing conditions within the university, it became advantageous for The Phoenix – S K to be classified as a final club, so on May 24, 1930, the Club became final.

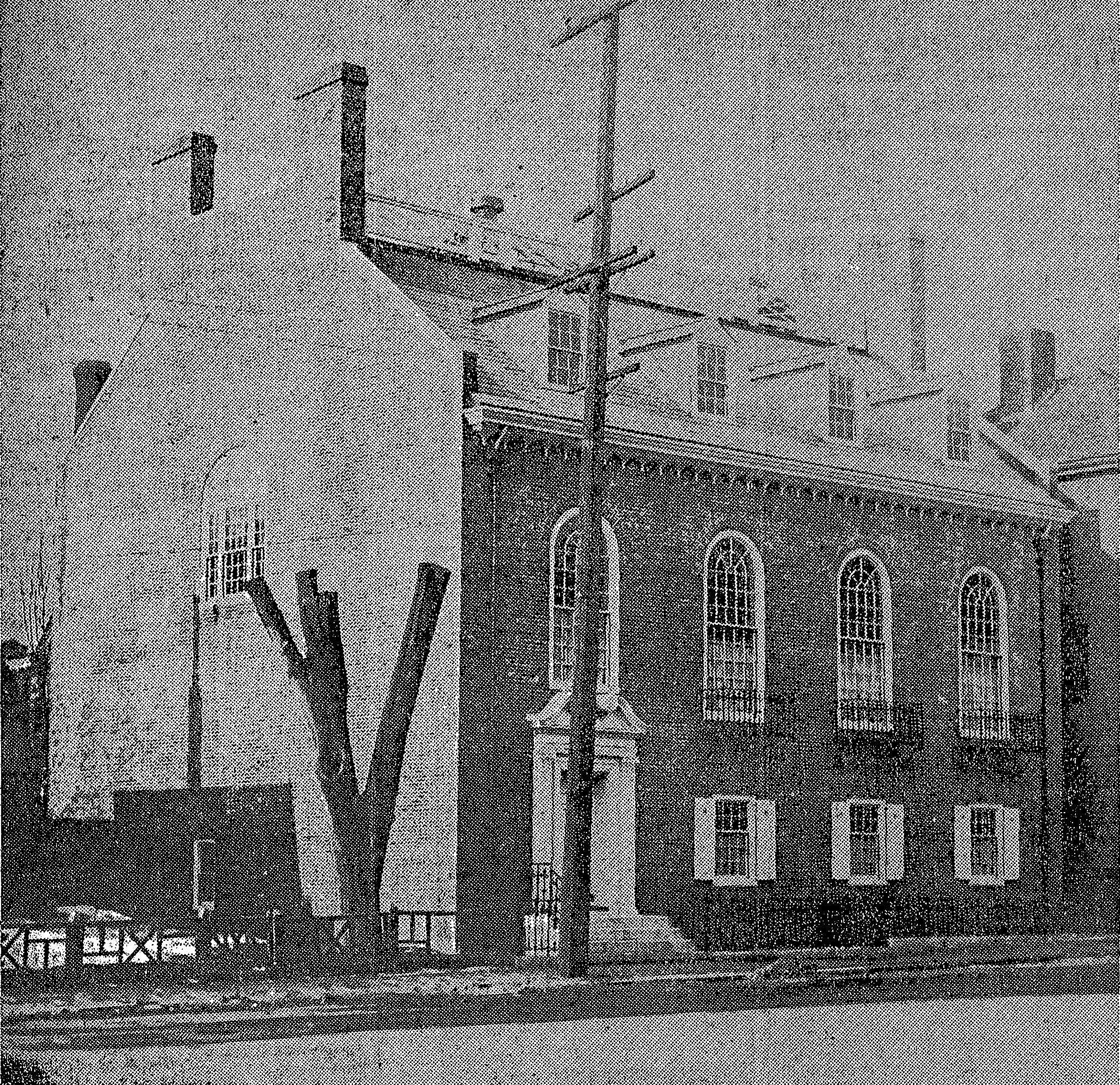
S K Club house, 1916

== Clubhouse ==
The Phoenix – S K clubhouse is at 72 Mt. Auburn Street in Cambridge, Massachusetts. It was built in 1915 for the SK Club on the site of The Sphinx Club clubhouse that was acquired in 1903. The SK Club first occupied the house on April 1, 1916.

== Membership ==
The Phoenix – S K Club has been noted for the diversity present within its membership.

== Activities ==
The club has been a hotspot for celebrities and Boston's local sports team members to participate in Harvard's nightlife. In April 2011, American musician and DJ Steve Aoki performed at the club.

In February 2015, the club came back under the spotlight when pictures of New England Patriots players Julian Edelman, Danny Amendola, and several other teammates purportedly partying at the Phoenix - S K Club house following their Super Bowl XLIX victory surfaced on social media.

On December 6, 2022, French Pianist Sofiane Pamart performed at the club.

In 2003, the club was the subject of unsubstantiated allegations of animal cruelty.

== Notable members ==
| Name | Initiation year | Notability | Reference |
|---|---|---|---|
| Andre Akpan | 2010 | Professional soccer player and two-time All-American first-team selection | |
| Gaspar G. Bacon | 1908 | President of the Massachusetts Senate and Lieutenant Governor of Massachusetts | |
| Robert L. Bacon | 1907 | United States House of Representatives | |
| Hunter Bigge | 2021 | Professional baseball pitcher | |
| William Richards Castle Jr. | 1900 | United States Assistant Secretary of State, United States Under Secretary of State, and U.S. Ambassador to Japan | |
| Philip Core | 1973 | Pioneer of gay art and writing | |
| Viet D. Dinh | 1990 | United States Assistant Attorney General (2001–2003), architect of the Patriot Act, and former chief legal and policy officer of Fox Corporation | |
| Jeffrey D. Dunn | 1977 | President and CEO of Sesame Workshop | |
| Buddy Fletcher | 1987 | Founder of Fletcher Asset Management; impeached as president of The Phoenix – S K Club | |
| Christopher Ford | 1989 | Former United States Assistant Secretary of State and Special Assistant to the President | |
| Frederik X | 1993 | King of Denmark and Count of Monpezat | |
| Michael K. Frith | 1963 | Artist and television producer, former executive vice president and creative director for Jim Henson Productions | |
| Lawrence Golub | 1980 | Founder and CEO of Golub Capital | |
| Ryu Goto | 2011 | Concert violinist and child prodigy | |
| Benjamin Apthorp Gould Fuller | 1900 | Philosopher and academic | |
| Noah Gray-Cabey | 2016 | Television actor and pianist known for his roles in My Wife and Kids and Heroes | |
| George Gund II | 1909 | President of Cleveland Trust Bank (1941–1962), the predecessor of KeyBank | |
| Kris Kobach | 1988 | Kansas Attorney General | |
| Chris Lambert | 2003 | Professional sprinter, represented Great Britain in the 2004 Olympic Games | |
| Abbott Lawrence Lowell | 1877, honorary | President of Harvard University from 1909–1933 | |
| Anand Mahindra | 1978 | Chairman of Mahindra Group | |
| Eric Mindich | 1988 | Youngest partner in Goldman Sachs history and founder of Eton Park Capital Management | |
| Thomas L. Monahan III | 1988 | CEO of Heidrick & Struggles; former CEO and president of DeVry University | |
| Samuel Eliot Morison | 1908 | Rear Admiral of the United States Navy, historian, and three-time Pulitzer Prize Winner | |
| Edwin Outwater | 1993 | Conductor and music director of the San Francisco Conservatory of Music | |
| Leverett Saltonstall | 1914 | 55th Governor of Massachusetts | |
| Eduardo Saverin | 2006 | Co-founder of Facebook | |
| Theodore Sedgwick | 1971 | U.S. Ambassador to the Slovak Republic | |
| Kaleil Isaza Tuzman | 1996 | CEO of KIT digital who was featured in the documentary film, Startup.com | |
| Kosaku Yada | 2007 | CEO of Westbrook; Chairman of Just Water by Jaden Smith | |

== See also ==
- Collegiate secret societies in North America
- Harvard College social clubs
