= 1981–82 Northeastern Huskies men's basketball team =

American college basketball season

1981–82 Northeastern Huskies men's basketball

ECAC North Regular-season champion ECAC North Conference tournament champion

NCAA tournament, Second round
- Conference: Eastern College Athletic Conference-North
- Record: 23–7 (8–1 ECAC-North)
- Head coach: Jim Calhoun (10th season)
- Assistant coaches: Karl Fogel; Kevin Stacom; J. Keith Motley
- Home arena: Matthews Arena

1981–82 ECAC North men's basketball standings
	Conf.				Overall
Team	W		L	PCT	W		L	PCT
Northeastern †	8	–	1	.889	23	–	7	.767
Canisius	7	–	2	.778	19	–	8	.704
Niagara	7	–	2	.778	19	–	10	.655
Boston University	6	–	2	.750	19	–	9	.679
Holy Cross	4	–	4	.500	16	–	11	.593
Maine	3	–	7	.300	7	–	19	.269
Colgate	2	–	6	.250	8	–	17	.320
Vermont	2	–	8	.200	10	–	16	.385
New Hampshire	2	–	9	.182	9	–	18	.333
† 1982 ECAC North tournament winner

The 1981–82 Northeastern Huskies men's basketball team represented Northeastern University during the 1981–82 college basketball season. Led by head coach Jim Calhoun, the Huskies competed in the ECAC North Conference and played their home games at Matthews Arena. They finished the season 23–7 overall with an 8–1 mark in ECAC North play to win the regular season conference title. They followed the regular season by winning the ECAC North Conference tournament to earn a bid to the NCAA tournament as No. 11 seed in the East region. After upsetting Saint Joseph's in the opening round, the Huskies were defeated in the second round by Villanova, 76–72 in 3OT.

== Roster ==
1981–82 Northeastern Huskies men's basketball team
Players
Coaches

Pos.	#	Name	Height	Weight	Year	Previous school	Hometown
G	4	Perry Moss	6 ft 2 in (1.88 m)	—	Jr	Amherst HS	Amherst, Massachusetts
G	5	Glenn Miller	6 ft 2 in (1.88 m)	185 lb (84 kg)	So	Robert E. Fitch HS	Groton, Connecticut
G	10	Skeeter Bryant	6 ft 3 in (1.91 m)	185 lb (84 kg)	Fr	Hope HS	Providence, Rhode Island
G	22	Phil Robinson	5 ft 11 in (1.8 m)	160 lb (73 kg)	So	St. Anthony HS	Jersey City, New Jersey
F	23	Steve Evans	6 ft 5 in (1.96 m)	185 lb (84 kg)	Fr	Weequahic HS	Newark, New Jersey
F	33	Mark Halsel	6 ft 6 in (1.98 m)	—	So	Schenley HS	Pittsburgh, Pennsylvania
C	34	Russ Ziemba	6 ft 7 in (2.01 m)	215 lb (98 kg)	So	St. Joseph HS	Perth Amboy, New Jersey

Head coach

- Jim Calhoun

Assistant coach(es)

- Karl Fogel
- Kevin Stacom
- J. Keith Motley

Legend

- (C) Team captain
- (S) Suspended
- (I) Ineligible
- (W) Walk-on
- Injured
- Current redshirt

== Schedule and results ==
Date time, TV	Rank^{#}	Opponent^{#}	Result	Record	Site city, state
Regular season
Dec 12, 1981*		vs. Iona	L 71–80	6–1	
Dec 18, 1981*		vs. Georgia	L 66–79	6–2	
Jan 16, 1982*		at Drexel	L 68–74		Daskalakis Athletic Center (976); Philadelphia, Pennsylvania
Jan 28, 1982*		at Boston College	L 77–87		Roberts Center; Chestnut Hill, Massachusetts
ECAC North tournament
Mar 6, 1982*		Boston University; Semifinals	W 49–48	21–6	Matthews Arena; Boston, Massachusetts
Mar 7, 1982*		Niagara; Championship game	W 82–59	22–6	Matthews Arena; Boston, Massachusetts
NCAA Tournament
Mar 12, 1982*	(11 E)	vs. (6 E) Saint Joseph's	W 63–62	23–6	Nassau Coliseum; Uniondale, New York
Mar 14, 1982*	(11 E)	vs. (3 E) Villanova	L 72–76 ^{3OT}	23–7	Nassau Coliseum; Uniondale, New York
*Non-conference game. ^{#}Rankings from AP poll. (#) Tournament seedings in parentheses. E=East.

== Awards and honors ==
- Perry Moss – ECAC North Player of the Year
