= 1980–81 Northeastern Huskies men's basketball team =

American college basketball season

1980–81 Northeastern Huskies men's basketball

ECAC North Regular-season champion ECAC North Conference tournament champion

NCAA tournament, Second round
- Conference: Eastern College Athletic Conference-North
- Record: 24–6 (6–0 ECAC-North)
- Head coach: Jim Calhoun (9th season)
- Assistant coaches: Karl Fogel (2nd season); Kevin Stacom; J. Keith Motley
- Home arena: Matthews Arena

1980–81 ECAC North men's basketball standings
	Conf.				Overall
Team	W		L	PCT	W		L	PCT
Northeastern †	21	–	5	.808	24	–	6	.800
Holy Cross	18	–	8	.692	20	–	10	.667
Vermont	15	–	11	.577	16	–	12	.571
Maine	13	–	13	.500	14	–	14	.500
Boston University	13	–	13	.500	13	–	14	.481
Canisius	11	–	15	.423	11	–	15	.423
Niagara	11	–	15	.423	11	–	15	.423
Colgate	11	–	17	.393	11	–	18	.379
New Hampshire	3	–	7	.300	7	–	19	.269
† 1981 ECAC North tournament winner

The 1980–81 Northeastern Huskies men's basketball team represented Northeastern University during the 1980–81 college basketball season. Led by head coach Jim Calhoun, the Huskies competed in the ECAC North Conference and played their home games at Matthews Arena. They finished the season 24–6 overall with a 6–0 mark in ECAC North play to win the regular season conference title. They followed the regular season by winning the ECAC North Conference tournament to earn a bid to the NCAA tournament as No. 11 seed in the West region. After upsetting Fresno State in the opening round, the Huskies were defeated in the second round by No. 3 seed Utah, 94–69.

== Roster ==
1980–81 Northeastern Huskies men's basketball team
Players
Coaches

Pos.	#	Name	Height	Weight	Year	Previous school	Hometown
G	4	Perry Moss	6 ft 2 in (1.88 m)	—	So	Amherst HS	Amherst, Massachusetts
G	5	Glenn Miller	6 ft 2 in (1.88 m)	185 lb (84 kg)	Fr	Robert E. Fitch HS	Groton, Connecticut
G	22	Phil Robinson	5 ft 11 in (1.8 m)	160 lb (73 kg)	Fr	St. Anthony HS	Jersey City, New Jersey
F	33	Mark Halsel	6 ft 6 in (1.98 m)	—	Fr	Schenley HS	Pittsburgh, Pennsylvania
C	34	Russ Ziemba	6 ft 7 in (2.01 m)	215 lb (98 kg)	Fr	St. Joseph HS	Perth Amboy, New Jersey

Head coach

- Jim Calhoun

Assistant coach(es)

- Karl Fogel
- Kevin Stacom
- J. Keith Motley

Legend

- (C) Team captain
- (S) Suspended
- (I) Ineligible
- (W) Walk-on
- Injured
- Current redshirt

== Schedule and results ==
Date time, TV	Rank^{#}	Opponent^{#}	Result	Record	Site city, state
Regular season
Jan 17, 1981*		Drexel	W 77–65	10–2	Matthews Arena; Boston, Massachusetts
ECAC North tournament
Mar 6, 1981*		vs. Vermont; Semifinals	W 76–69 ^{OT}	22–5	Alfond Arena; Orono, Maine
Mar 7, 1981*		Holy Cross; Championship game	W 81–79 ^{OT}	23–5	Matthews Arena; Boston, Massachusetts
NCAA Tournament
Mar 13, 1981*	(11 W)	vs. (6 W) Fresno State; First round	W 55–53	24–5	Special Events Center; El Paso, Texas
Mar 15, 1981*	(11 W)	vs. (3 W) No. 14 Utah; Second round	L 69–94	24–6	Special Events Center; El Paso, Texas
*Non-conference game. ^{#}Rankings from AP poll. (#) Tournament seedings in parentheses. W=West.
