= Amherst Regional High School (Massachusetts) =

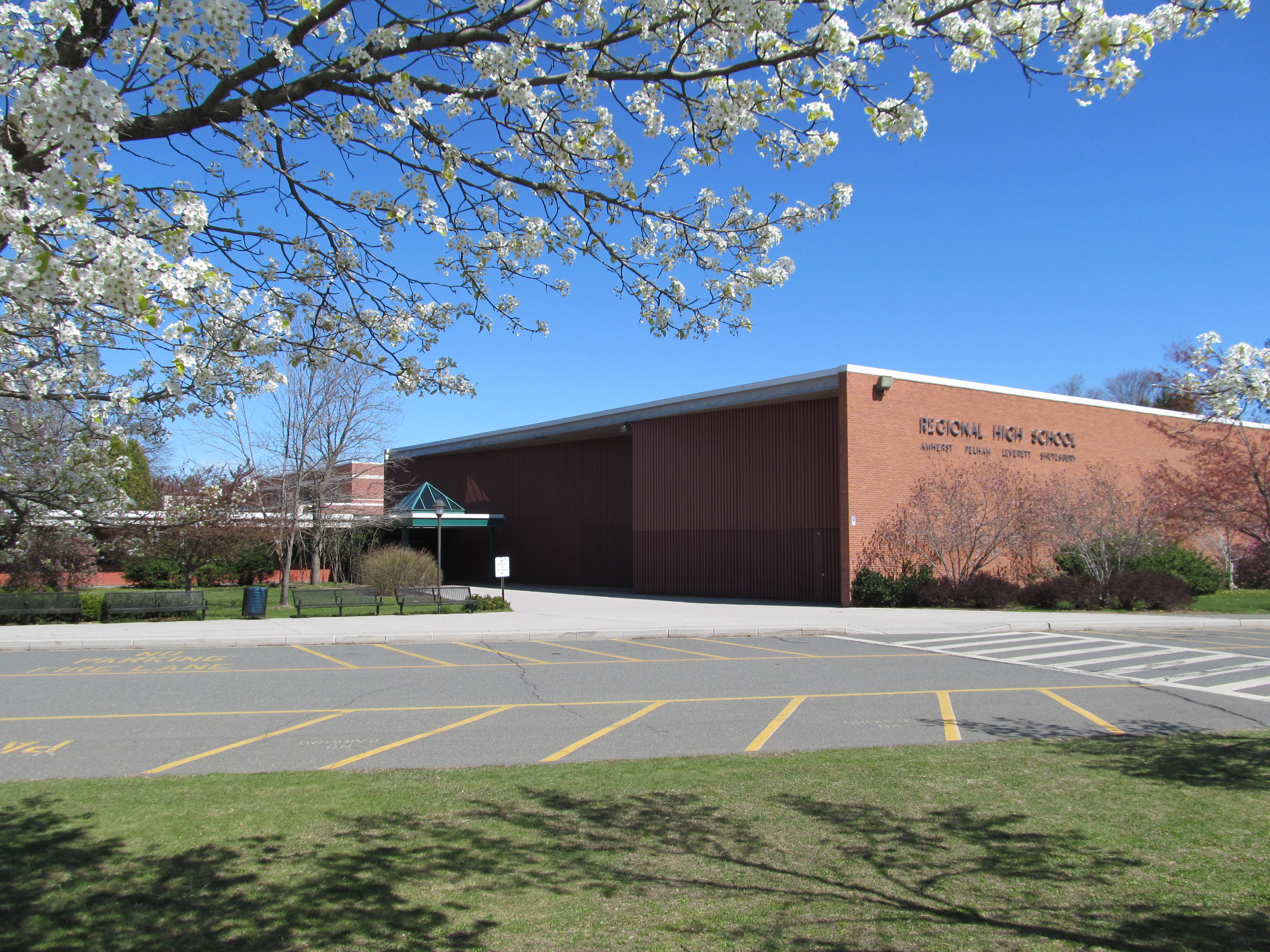
- Amherst Regional High School in 2012

Location
- 21 Mattoon Street; Amherst, Massachusetts 01002; United States; 42°22′51″N 72°30′46″W

Information
- School type: Public High School; Open enrollment
- Motto: Veritas Unitas Caritas (Truth Unity Charity)
- Founded: 1956
- Superintendent: Douglas Slaughter
- Principal: Talib Sadiq
- Teaching staff: 72.08 (FTE)
- Grades: 9–12
- Enrollment: 816 (2024–2025)
- Student to teacher ratio: 11.32
- Language: English with ELL programs
- Colors: Maroon and White
- Mascot: Hurri the Hurricane
- Team name: Hurricanes
- Newspaper: The Graphic
- Yearbook: The Goldbug
- Communities served: Amherst, Pelham, Leverett, Shutesbury
- Website: arhs.arps.org

Amherst Regional High School (ARHS) is a secondary school in Amherst, Massachusetts, United States, for students in grades 9–12. It is part of the Amherst-Pelham Regional School District, which comprises the towns of Amherst, Pelham, Leverett, and Shutesbury, Massachusetts. Its official colors are maroon and white.

== Extracurricular and non-academic activities ==
=== Sports ===
The school's sports teams are known as the Hurricanes. The nickname first appears in the Goldbug yearbook of 1942, in the Sports/Baseball section, "Hurricanes humble Hopkins". The nickname is likely in recognition of the 1938 New England Hurricane. "History of the Class", Goldbug 1939, is entitled "The Epic Of A Hurricane"; it begins "We are a hurricane."

The boys' cross-country team has been listed in the top 100 high school teams in America, and has won many Western Massachusetts championships, most recently in 2018. In 2001 they won the State Championship.

ARHS is one of many high schools in Massachusetts with a nationally ranked Ultimate program. The program hosts the annual Amherst Invitational Ultimate Tournament which pits 30 high school teams from across the country in the oldest and one of the largest high school tournaments in the USA.

The 1992–1993 girls' basketball team inspired the book In These Girls, Hope is a Muscle by Madeleine Blais.

The Football team won the 1999 Massachusetts High School Super Bowl by defeating Southbridge, 27–7. It was the first Super Bowl win for Amherst in 25 years.

Amherst High Athletics came to national attention in the fall of 2016, when the entire volleyball team, with the exception of one player, decided to kneel during the playing of the National Anthem at an away game against rival Minnechaug on Oct. 7, 2016. The sole player who chose to stand was profiled by ESPN.

== Notable alumni ==
- Annie Baker (class of '99), Pulitzer Prize winning playwright
- Thomas Bezucha (class of '82), film director and writer of Big Eden and The Family Stone
- David F M Brown (class of '81), President, Massachusetts General Hospital; Trustees Endowed Professor, Harvard Medical School
- John Doleva, President and chief executive officer of the Naismith Memorial Basketball Hall of Fame
- Madeleine George, award-winning playwright and young-adult author
- John Henry, former MLB player (Washington Senators, Boston Braves)
- Michael Hixon (class of '13), diver
- James Ihedigbo (class of '02), Philanthropist and retired NFL safety who played 2007-2016 for the New York Jets, New England Patriots, Baltimore Ravens (including 2012 Super Bowl), Detroit Lions, and Buffalo Bills
- Nayana LaFond, painter, sculptor, and curator
- Amory Lovins, sustainability guru and CEO of the Rocky Mountain Institute
- Eric Mabius (class of '89), actor known for his roles as Daniel Meade on Ugly Betty and as Tim Haspel on The L Word
- Michael E. Mann (class of ‘84), climatologist and geophysicist and current director of the Earth System Science Center at Pennsylvania State University
- J Mascis (class of '83), of Dinosaur Jr. and other bands
- Makaya McCraven (class of '02), jazz drummer and bandleader
- Julie McNiven (class of '98), actress
- Ellen Moran (class of '84), Chief of Staff to the U.S. Secretary of Commerce
- Perry Moss (class of '78), NBA player
- Peter Moss (class of '75), college basketball player
- Ebon Moss-Bachrach (class of '95), actor
- Benjamin Nugent (class of '95), writer
- Gil Penchina (class of '87), CEO of Wikia
- David Romer (class of '76), Herman Royer Professor of Political Economy at the University of California, Berkeley
- Robbie Russell, (class of '97), played soccer for the MLS teams Real Salt Lake and D.C. United
- Deb Talan (class of '86), an American singer-songwriter for the folk-pop duo The Weepies.
- Kaleil Isaza Tuzman and Tom Herman (both class of '89), founders of govWorks and stars of the documentary film Startup.com
- Christopher O. Ward (class of '72), executive director of PANYNJ, NYC Commissioner of Department of Environmental Protection
- Jamila Wideman (class of '93), former WNBA player
- Martins Licis (class of '09), strongman
- Kevin Ziomek (class of '10), professional baseball player in Detroit Tigers minor league
