= Ziomek (surname) =

Ziomek is a Polish surname. Notable people with the surname include:

- Kaja Ziomek (born 1997), Polish speed skater
- Kevin Ziomek (born 1992), American baseball player
