= 1981 ECAC North men's basketball tournament =

- Classification: Division I
- Season: 1980–81
- Teams: 6
- Site: Campus sites
- Champions: Northeastern (1st title)
- Winning coach: Jim Calhoun (1st title)
- MVP: Perry Moss (Northeastern)
- ECAC North men's basketball tournaments

1980–81 ECAC North men's basketball standings
	Conf.				Overall
Team	W		L	PCT	W		L	PCT
Northeastern †	21	–	5	.808	24	–	6	.800
Holy Cross	18	–	8	.692	20	–	10	.667
Vermont	15	–	11	.577	16	–	12	.571
Maine	13	–	13	.500	14	–	14	.500
Boston University	13	–	13	.500	13	–	14	.481
Canisius	11	–	15	.423	11	–	15	.423
Niagara	11	–	15	.423	11	–	15	.423
Colgate	11	–	17	.393	11	–	18	.379
New Hampshire	3	–	7	.300	7	–	19	.269
† 1981 ECAC North tournament winner

The 1981 ECAC North men's basketball tournament was the postseason men's basketball tournament of the ECAC North during the 1980–81 NCAA Division I men's basketball season. Games were played at campus sites.

Northeastern won the tournament, defeating Boston University in the championship game, and received the ECAC North's automatic bid to the NCAA tournament. Perry Moss of Northeastern was named the tournament's most valuable player.

== Format ==
Six teams played in the 1981 tournament. All games were played on campus sites, and teams were unseeded.

Niagara, Canisius, and New Hampshire did not participate in the tournament.

== Bracket and Results ==
Quarterfinals
Vermont	85***
Boston University	84
Maine	87
Colgate	83

Semifinals
Northeastern	76*
Vermont	69
Holy Cross	63
Maine	54

Finals
Northeastern	81*
Holy Cross	79

* - denotes overtime period

== See also ==
- America East Conference
