= 1983–84 Northeastern Huskies men's basketball team =

American college basketball season

1983–84 Northeastern Huskies men's basketball

ECAC North Regular-season champion ECAC North Conference tournament champion

NCAA tournament, First Round
- Conference: Eastern College Athletic Conference-North
- Record: 27–5 (14–0 ECAC-North)
- Head coach: Jim Calhoun (12th season)
- Assistant coaches: Karl Fogel; Kevin Stacom; J. Keith Motley
- Home arena: Matthews Arena

1983–84 ECAC North men's basketball standings
	Conf.				Overall
Team	W		L	PCT	W		L	PCT
Northeastern †	14	–	0	1.000	27	–	5	.844
Canisius	9	–	5	.643	19	–	11	.633
Boston University	9	–	5	.643	16	–	13	.552
New Hampshire	8	–	6	.571	15	–	13	.536
Maine	7	–	7	.500	17	–	10	.630
Niagara	5	–	9	.357	10	–	18	.357
Vermont	3	–	11	.214	7	–	21	.250
Colgate	1	–	13	.071	5	–	22	.185
† 1984 ECAC North tournament winner

The 1983–84 Northeastern Huskies men's basketball team represented Northeastern University during the 1983–84 college basketball season. Led by head coach Jim Calhoun, the Huskies competed in the ECAC North Conference and played their home games at Matthews Arena. They finished the season 27–5 overall with a perfect 14–0 mark in ECAC North play to win the regular season conference title. They followed the regular season by winning the ECAC North Conference tournament to earn a bid to the NCAA tournament as No. 11 seed in the East region. After defeating Long Island in the preliminary round, the Huskies were defeated in the opening round by VCU, 70–69.

== Roster ==
1983–84 Northeastern Huskies men's basketball team
Players
Coaches

Pos.	#	Name	Height	Weight	Year	Previous school	Hometown
G	5	Glenn Miller	6 ft 2 in (1.88 m)	185 lb (84 kg)	Sr	Robert E. Fitch HS	Groton, Connecticut
G	10	Skeeter Bryant	6 ft 3 in (1.91 m)	185 lb (84 kg)	Jr	Hope HS	Providence, Rhode Island
G	11	Enndy Basquiat	6 ft 4 in (1.93 m)	190 lb (86 kg)	So	Spring Valley HS	Brooklyn, New York
G	20	Andre LaFleur	6 ft 3 in (1.91 m)	180 lb (82 kg)	Fr	Gov. Dummer Academy	Los Angeles, California
F	21	Wes Fuller	6 ft 5 in (1.96 m)	190 lb (86 kg)	Fr	Camden HS	Camden, New Jersey
G	22	Phil Robinson	5 ft 11 in (1.8 m)	160 lb (73 kg)	Sr	St. Anthony HS	Jersey City, New Jersey
F	23	Steve Evans	6 ft 5 in (1.96 m)	185 lb (84 kg)	Jr	Weequahic HS	Newark, New Jersey
F	33	Mark Halsel	6 ft 6 in (1.98 m)	—	Sr	Schenley HS	Pittsburgh, Pennsylvania
C	34	Russ Ziemba	6 ft 7 in (2.01 m)	215 lb (98 kg)	Sr	St. Joseph HS	Perth Amboy, New Jersey
G/F	35	Reggie Lewis	6 ft 7 in (2.01 m)	185 lb (84 kg)	Fr	Paul Laurence Dunbar HS	Baltimore, Maryland

Head coach

- Jim Calhoun

Assistant coach(es)

- Karl Fogel
- Kevin Stacom
- J. Keith Motley

Legend

- (C) Team captain
- (S) Suspended
- (I) Ineligible
- (W) Walk-on
- Injured
- Current redshirt

== Schedule and results ==
Date time, TV	Rank^{#}	Opponent^{#}	Result	Record	Site city, state
Regular season
Nov 25, 1983*		vs. Purdue; Sun Met Classic	L 64–83	0–1	Selland Arena; Fresno, California
Nov 26, 1983*		vs. North Dakota State; Sun Met Classic	W 94–77	1–1	Selland Arena; Fresno, California
Nov 30, 1983*		Hartford	W 93–71	2–1	Matthews Arena; Boston, Massachusetts
Dec 3, 1983		at Vermont	W 88–73	3–1 (1–0)	Patrick Gym; Burlington, Vermont
Dec 7, 1983*		Merrimack	W 78–54	4–1	Matthews Arena; Boston, Massachusetts
Dec 10, 1983*		at Cornell	L 64–74	4–2	Barton Hall; Ithaca, New York
Dec 17, 1983*		at Fairfield	W 83–73	5–2	Alumni Hall; Fairfield, Connecticut
Dec 28, 1983*		vs. Princeton	W 55–34	6–2	
Dec 29, 1983*		vs. St. Bonaventure	W 87–72	7–2	
Jan 3, 1984		Maine	W 83–81	8–2 (2–0)	Matthews Arena; Boston, Massachusetts
Jan 5, 1984		at New Hampshire	W 91–86	9–2 (3–0)	Lundholm Gym; Durham, New Hampshire
Jan 7, 1984*		East Carolina	W 69–61	10–2	Matthews Arena; Boston, Massachusetts
Jan 11, 1984		Vermont	W 99–79	11–2 (4–0)	Matthews Arena; El Paso, Texas
Jan 16, 1984		at Maine	W 81–75	12–2 (5–0)	Alfond Arena; Orono, Maine
Jan 18, 1984*		at No. 16 Boston College	L 78–81	12–3	Roberts Center; Boston, Massachusetts
Jan 21, 1984		at Colgate	W 69–49	13–3 (6–0)	Cotterell Court; Hamilton, New York
Jan 28, 1984*		Utica	W 106–86	14–3	Matthews Arena; Boston, Massachusetts
Feb 1, 1984*		Army	W 76–60	15–3	Matthews Arena; Boston, Massachusetts
Feb 4, 1984		at Canisius	W 68–66	16–3 (7–0)	Koessler Athletic Center; Buffalo, New York
Feb 6, 1984		at Niagara	W 76–70	17–3 (8–0)	Buffalo Memorial Auditorium; Lewiston, New York
Feb 9, 1984		New Hampshire	W 95–81	18–3 (9–0)	Matthews Arena; Boston, Massachusetts
Feb 11, 1984		at Boston University	W 83–77	19–3 (10–0)	Case Gym; Boston, Massachusetts
Feb 15, 1984*		at North Carolina State	L 74–77	19–4	Reynolds Coliseum; Raleigh, North Carolina
Feb 18, 1984		Colgate	W 79–60	20–4 (11–0)	Matthews Arena; Boston, Massachusetts
Feb 25, 1984*		Canisius	W 68–60	21–4 (12–0)	Matthews Arena; Boston, Massachusetts
Feb 27, 1984		Niagara	W 94–90	22–4 (13–0)	Matthews Arena; Boston, Massachusetts
Mar 1, 1984		Boston University	W 85–83	23–4 (14–0)	Matthews Arena; Boston, Massachusetts
ECAC North tournament
Mar 5, 1984*		Colgate; Quarterfinals	W 71–44	24–4	Matthews Arena; Boston, Massachusetts
Mar 8, 1984*		Maine; Semifinals	W 83–77	25–4	Matthews Arena; Boston, Massachusetts
Mar 10, 1984*		Canisius; Championship game	W 85–75	26–4	Matthews Arena; Boston, Massachusetts
NCAA Tournament
Mar 13, 1984*	(11 E)	vs. (11 E) Long Island; Preliminary round	W 90–87	27–4	The Palestra; Philadelphia, Pennsylvania
Mar 16, 1984*	(11 E)	vs. (6 E) Virginia Commonwealth; First round	L 69–70	27–5	Brendan Byrne Arena; East Rutherford, New Jersey
*Non-conference game. ^{#}Rankings from AP poll. (#) Tournament seedings in parentheses. E=East.

== Awards and honors ==
- Mark Halsel – ECAC North Player of the Year
