= 1982 ECAC North men's basketball tournament =

- Classification: Division I
- Season: 1981–82
- Teams: 6
- Site: Campus sites
- Champions: Northeastern (2nd title)
- Winning coach: Jim Calhoun (2nd title)
- MVP: Perry Moss (Northeastern)
- ECAC North men's basketball tournaments

1981–82 ECAC North men's basketball standings
	Conf.				Overall
Team	W		L	PCT	W		L	PCT
Northeastern †	8	–	1	.889	23	–	7	.767
Canisius	7	–	2	.778	19	–	8	.704
Niagara	7	–	2	.778	19	–	10	.655
Boston University	6	–	2	.750	19	–	9	.679
Holy Cross	4	–	4	.500	16	–	11	.593
Maine	3	–	7	.300	7	–	19	.269
Colgate	2	–	6	.250	8	–	17	.320
Vermont	2	–	8	.200	10	–	16	.385
New Hampshire	2	–	9	.182	9	–	18	.333
† 1982 ECAC North tournament winner

The 1982 ECAC North men's basketball tournament was the postseason men's basketball tournament of the ECAC North during the 1981–82 NCAA Division I men's basketball season. Games were played at campus sites.

Northeastern won the tournament, defeating Niagara in the championship game, and received the ECAC North's automatic bid to the NCAA tournament. Perry Moss of Northeastern was named the tournament's most valuable player.

== Format ==
Six teams played in the 1982 tournament. All games were played on campus sites, and teams were unseeded.

Maine, Colgate, and Vermont did not participate in the tournament.

== Bracket and Results ==
Quarterfinals
Boston University	50
Holy Cross	49
Niagara	105
New Hampshire	87

Semifinals
Northeastern	49
Boston University	48
Canisius	75
Niagara	76

Finals
Northeastern	62
Niagara	59

== See also ==
- America East Conference
