= John Clark (basketball player) =

American basketball player

Personal information
- Born: Pittsburgh, Pennsylvania
- Listed height: 6 ft 2 in (1.88 m)
- Listed weight: 180 lb (82 kg)

Career information
- College: Northeastern (1972–1976)
- NBA draft: 1976: 8th round, 139th overall pick
- Drafted by: Boston Celtics
- Position: Guard
- Stats at Basketball Reference

John J. Clark is an American former basketball player. He played college basketball for the Northeastern Huskies from 1972 to 1976 where he graduated as the team's all-time leading scorer.

Clark was selected by the Boston Celtics in the sixth round of the 1976 NBA draft.

Clark was inducted into the Northeastern Varsity Club Hall of Fame in 1987. His coach Jim Calhoun referred to him as "the complete student/athlete."
