= 1984 ECAC North men's basketball tournament =

- Classification: Division I
- Season: 1983–84
- Teams: 8
- Champions: Northeastern (3rd title)
- Winning coach: Jim Calhoun (3rd title)
- MVP: Mark Halsel (Northeastern)
- ECAC North men's basketball tournaments

1983–84 ECAC North men's basketball standings
	Conf.				Overall
Team	W		L	PCT	W		L	PCT
Northeastern †	14	–	0	1.000	27	–	5	.844
Canisius	9	–	5	.643	19	–	11	.633
Boston University	9	–	5	.643	16	–	13	.552
New Hampshire	8	–	6	.571	15	–	13	.536
Maine	7	–	7	.500	17	–	10	.630
Niagara	5	–	9	.357	10	–	18	.357
Vermont	3	–	11	.214	7	–	21	.250
Colgate	1	–	13	.071	5	–	22	.185
† 1984 ECAC North tournament winner

The 1984 ECAC North men's basketball tournament was hosted by the higher seeds in head-to-head matchups. The final was held at Matthews Arena on the campus of the Northeastern University. Northeastern gained its third overall America East Conference Championship and an automatic berth to the NCAA tournament with its win over Canisius College. Northeastern was given the 11th seed in the East Regional of the NCAA Tournament and lost in the first round against Virginia Commonwealth 70–69.

== Bracket and Results ==
Quarterfinals
1	Northeastern	71
8	Colgate	44
4	New Hampshire	77
5	Maine	80
3	Boston University	67
6	Niagara	57
2	Canisius	80
7	Vermont	76

Semifinals
1	Northeastern	83
5	Maine	77
3	Boston University	68
2	Canisius	73

Finals
1	Northeastern	85
2	Canisius	75

== See also ==
- America East Conference
