= 1991 North Atlantic Conference men's basketball tournament =

- Classification: Division I
- Season: 1990–91
- Teams: 6
- Champions: Northeastern (7th title)
- Winning coach: Karl Fogel (2nd title)
- MVP: Ron Lacey (Northeastern)
- North Atlantic Conference men's basketball tournaments

1990–91 North Atlantic Conference men's basketball standings
	Conf.				Overall
Team	W		L	PCT	W		L	PCT
Northeastern †	8	–	2	.800	22	–	11	.667
Maine	7	–	3	.700	13	–	16	.448
Boston University	5	–	5	.500	11	–	18	.379
Vermont	5	–	5	.500	15	–	13	.536
Hartford	5	–	5	.500	13	–	16	.448
New Hampshire	0	–	10	.000	3	–	25	.107
† 1991 NAC tournament winner

The 1991 North Atlantic Conference men's basketball tournament was hosted by the higher seeds in head-to-head matchups. The final was held at Matthews Arena on the campus of Northeastern University. Northeastern gained its seventh and final America East Conference Championship and an automatic berth to the NCAA tournament with its win over Maine. Northeastern was given the 16th seed in the East Regional of the NCAA Tournament and lost in the first round to North Carolina 101–66.

== Bracket and results ==
The tournament took place between March 5–7.

Quarterfinals
4	Vermont	65
5	Hartford	85
3	Boston U.	88
6	New Hampshire	57

Semifinals
1	Northeastern	74
5	Hartford	59
2	Maine	71
3	Boston U.	58

Finals
1	Northeastern	57
2	Maine	46

== See also ==
- America East Conference
