= 1984 ECAC Metro men's basketball tournament =

- Classification: Division I
- Season: 1983–84
- Teams: 8
- Site: McCann Field House; Poughkeepsie, NY
- Champions: Long Island (1st title)
- Winning coach: Paul Lizzo (1st title)
- MVP: Carey Scurry (Long Island)
- ECAC Metro men's basketball tournaments

1983–84 ECAC Metro men's basketball standings
	Conf.				Overall
Team	W		L	PCT	W		L	PCT
Long Island †	11	–	5	.688	20	–	11	.645
Robert Morris	11	–	5	.688	17	–	13	.567
Fairleigh Dickinson	10	–	6	.625	17	–	12	.586
Loyola (MD)	10	–	6	.625	16	–	12	.571
Marist	8	–	8	.500	14	–	15	.483
Siena	8	–	8	.500	15	–	13	.536
Saint Francis (PA)	8	–	8	.500	12	–	15	.444
Wagner	5	–	11	.313	8	–	20	.286
St. Francis (NY)	1	–	15	.063	2	–	26	.071
† 1984 ECAC Metro tournament winner Rankings from AP Poll

The 1984 ECAC Metro men's basketball tournament (now known as the Northeast Conference men's basketball tournament) was held March 8–10. All three rounds of the tournament were played at McCann Field House in Poughkeepsie, New York.

Long Island defeated two-time defending tournament champion Robert Morris in the championship game, 87–81, to win the school's first ECAC Metro men's basketball tournament title. The Blackbirds earned the automatic bid to the 1984 NCAA Tournament.

== Bracket ==
Quarterfinals; Sunday, March 8
1	Long Island	67
8	St. Francis (NY)	62
4	Loyola (MD)	66
5	Marist	75
3	Fairleigh Dickinson	68
6	Siena	62
2	Robert Morris	68
7	Wagner	62

Semifinals; Tuesday, March 9
1	Long Island	64
5	Marist	55
3	Fairleigh Dickinson	58
2	Robert Morris	62

Championship; Wednesday, March 10
1	Long Island	87
2	Robert Morris	81
