= 1985–86 Northeastern Huskies men's basketball team =

American college basketball season

1985–86 Northeastern Huskies men's basketball

ECAC North Regular-season champion ECAC North Conference tournament champion

NCAA tournament, First Round
- Conference: Eastern College Athletic Conference-North
- Record: 26–5 (16–2 ECAC-North)
- Head coach: Jim Calhoun (14th season)
- Assistant coaches: Karl Fogel; Kevin Stacom; J. Keith Motley
- Home arena: Matthews Arena

1985–86 ECAC North men's basketball standings
	Conf.				Overall
Team	W		L	PCT	W		L	PCT
Northeastern †	16	–	2	.889	26	–	5	.839
Canisius	14	–	4	.778	21	–	8	.724
Boston University	13	–	5	.722	21	–	10	.677
Siena	12	–	6	.667	21	–	8	.724
Niagara	10	–	8	.556	14	–	14	.500
Hartford	10	–	8	.556	12	–	16	.429
New Hampshire	5	–	13	.278	11	–	17	.393
Maine	5	–	13	.278	7	–	20	.259
Vermont	5	–	13	.278	9	–	19	.321
Colgate	0	–	18	.000	1	–	24	.040
† 1986 ECAC North tournament winner Rankings from AP Poll

The 1985–86 Northeastern Huskies men's basketball team represented Northeastern University during the 1985–86 college basketball season. Led by head coach Jim Calhoun, serving in his 14th and final season at the school, the Huskies competed in the ECAC North Conference and played their home games at Matthews Arena. They finished the season 22–9 overall with a 16–2 mark in ECAC North play to win the regular season conference title. They followed the regular season by winning the ECAC North Conference tournament to earn a bid to the NCAA tournament as No. 13 seed in the East region. The Huskies were defeated in the opening round by No. 4 seed Oklahoma, 80–74.

== Roster ==
1985–86 Northeastern Huskies men's basketball team
Players
Coaches

Pos.	#	Name	Height	Weight	Year	Previous school	Hometown
G	11	Enndy Basquiat	6 ft 4 in (1.93 m)	190 lb (86 kg)	Sr	Spring Valley HS	Brooklyn, New York
G	20	Andre LaFleur	6 ft 3 in (1.91 m)	180 lb (82 kg)	Jr	Gov. Dummer Academy	Los Angeles, California
F	21	Wes Fuller	6 ft 5 in (1.96 m)	190 lb (86 kg)	Jr	Camden HS	Camden, New Jersey
G/F	35	Reggie Lewis	6 ft 7 in (2.01 m)	185 lb (84 kg)	Jr	Paul Laurence Dunbar HS	Baltimore, Maryland

Head coach

- Jim Calhoun

Assistant coach(es)

- Karl Fogel
- Kevin Stacom
- J. Keith Motley

Legend

- (C) Team captain
- (S) Suspended
- (I) Ineligible
- (W) Walk-on
- Injured
- Current redshirt

== Schedule and results ==
Date time, TV	Rank^{#}	Opponent^{#}	Result	Record	Site city, state
Regular season
Nov 23, 1985*		at No. 19 Maryland	L 72–84	0–1	Cole Fieldhouse (10,800); College Park, Maryland
Dec 2, 1985*		at Providence	L 68–83	0–2	Providence Civic Center (4,602); Providence, Rhode Island
Dec 5, 1985		Vermont	W 65–60	1–2 (1–0)	Matthews Arena (1,365); Boston, Massachusetts
Dec 7, 1985*		Cornell	W 55–51	2–2	Matthews Arena (1,421); Boston, Massachusetts
Dec 14, 1985*		UMass	W 71–68	3–2	Matthews Arena (1,219); Boston, Massachusetts
Dec 16, 1985*		at Stetson	W 75–61	4–2	Edmunds Center (2,716); DeLand, Florida
Dec 27, 1985*		vs. Duquesne; Connecticut Mutual Classic	W 88–81	5–2	Hartford Civic Center (5,217); Hartford, Connecticut
Dec 28, 1985*		at Connecticut; Connecticut Mutual Classic	W 90–73	6–2	Hartford Civic Center (11,688); Hartford, Connecticut
Jan 9, 1986		at Colgate	W 68–56	7–2 (2–0)	Cotterell Court (350); Hamilton, New York
Jan 11, 1986*		Maine	W 56–54	8–2 (3–0)	Matthews Arena (2,107); Boston, Massachusetts
Jan 13, 1986*		Tufts	W 76–52	9–2	Matthews Arena (1,013); Boston, Massachusetts
Jan 15, 1986*		vs. Army	W 55–49	10–2	Brendan Byrne Arena (3,518); East Rutherford, New Jersey
Jan 21, 1986		New Hampshire	W 78–65	11–2 (4–0)	Matthews Arena (1,057); Boston, Massachusetts
Jan 28, 1986		at Vermont	W 73–57	12–2 (5–0)	Patrick Gym (455); Burlington, Vermont
Jan 30, 1986		at Niagara	W 90–75	13–2 (6–0)	Gallagher Center (2,962); Lewiston, New York
Feb 1, 1986		at Canisius	L 47–58	13–3 (6–1)	Buffalo Memorial Auditorium (7,315); Buffalo, New York
Feb 4, 1986		Hartford	W 87–76	14–3 (7–1)	Matthews Arena (1,050); Boston, Massachusetts
Feb 6, 1986		Colgate	W 69–54	15–3 (8–1)	Matthews Arena (810); Boston, Massachusetts
Feb 8, 1986		at Boston University	W 75–67	16–3 (9–1)	Case Gym (2,763); Boston, Massachusetts
Feb 11, 1986		at Hartford	W 74–70	17–3 (10–1)	Hartford Civic Center (5,070); Hartford, Connecticut
Feb 15, 1986		at Siena	L 65–71	17–4 (10–2)	Alumni Recreation Center (3,719); Loudonville, New York
Feb 17, 1986		at Maine	W 72–57	18–4 (11–2)	Alfond Arena (1,450); Orono, Maine
Feb 19, 1986		Siena	W 96–73	19–4 (12–2)	Matthews Arena (2,384); Boston, Massachusetts
Feb 22, 1986		Canisius	W 90–57	20–4 (13–2)	Matthews Arena (3,891); Boston, Massachusetts
Feb 24, 1986		Niagara	W 85–67	21–4 (14–2)	Matthews Arena (1,819); Boston, Massachusetts
Feb 27, 1986		Boston University	W 90–70	22–4 (15–2)	Matthews Arena (4,198); Boston, Massachusetts
Mar 1, 1986		at New Hampshire	W 66–53	23–4 (16–2)	Lundholm Gym (1,675); Durham, New Hampshire
ECAC North tournament
Mar 5, 1986*		Vermont; Quarterfinals	W 82–61	24–4	Matthews Arena (1,364); Boston, Massachusetts
Mar 6, 1986*		Siena; Semifinals	W 89–75	25–4	Matthews Arena (2,876); Boston, Massachusetts
Mar 7, 1986*		Boston University; Championship game	W 63–54	26–4	Matthews Arena (5,644); Boston, Massachusetts
NCAA Tournament
Mar 13, 1986*	(13 E)	vs. (4 E) No. 15 Oklahoma	L 74–80	26–5	Greensboro Coliseum (7,640); Greensboro, North Carolina
*Non-conference game. ^{#}Rankings from AP poll. (#) Tournament seedings in parentheses. E=East.

== Awards and honors ==
- Reggie Lewis – ECAC North Player of the Year (2x)
