= Peter Moss (basketball) =

American college basketball player (born c. 1959/60)

Personal information
- Born: c. 1959/60
- Listed height: 6 ft 4 in (1.93 m)

Career information
- High school: Amherst Regional (Amherst, Massachusetts); Northfield Mount Hermon (Gill, Massachusetts)
- College: Brown (1977–1980)
- NBA draft: 1980: undrafted
- Position: Forward

Career highlights
- Ivy League Player of the Year (1980); 2× First-team All-Ivy League (1979, 1980)

Peter V. Moss (born c. 1959/60) is an American former college basketball player for Brown University. He was the 1980 Ivy League Player of the Year.

== Playing career ==
A native of Amherst, Massachusetts, Moss had a successful prep career first for Amherst Regional High School followed by one postgraduate prep year at Northfield Mount Hermon School. He did not start playing basketball until his sophomore year of high school, but was good enough to ultimately play NCAA Division I basketball for the Brown Bears. Moss played for the school's freshman team in 1976–77, then lettered for Brown's varsity squad during his final three years. In that stretch, he was twice named to the All-Ivy League First Team and led the league in points per game as a senior (21.2), which helped him earn the conference's player of the year award. For his career, Moss scored 1,241 points, which at the time of his graduation stood sixth in school history. In 1986, Moss was inducted into Brown's athletics hall of fame.

== Personal ==
Later in his life, Moss became a marketing representative with IBM in Cherry Hill, New Jersey. He is the brother of Perry Moss, a former NBA player who was the 1982 America East Conference Player of the Year. They also have a sister, Paula Moss, who graduated in 1982 as Tufts University's all-time leading scorer with 1,018 points (since surpassed).
