= 1986 ECAC North men's basketball tournament =

University men's basketball tournament in 1986

- Classification: Division I
- Season: 1985–86
- Teams: 8
- Champions: Northeastern (5th title)
- Winning coach: Jim Calhoun (5th title)
- MVP: Wess Fuller (Northeastern)
- ECAC North men's basketball tournaments

1985–86 ECAC North men's basketball standings
	Conf.				Overall
Team	W		L	PCT	W		L	PCT
Northeastern †	16	–	2	.889	26	–	5	.839
Canisius	14	–	4	.778	21	–	8	.724
Boston University	13	–	5	.722	21	–	10	.677
Siena	12	–	6	.667	21	–	8	.724
Niagara	10	–	8	.556	14	–	14	.500
Hartford	10	–	8	.556	12	–	16	.429
New Hampshire	5	–	13	.278	11	–	17	.393
Maine	5	–	13	.278	7	–	20	.259
Vermont	5	–	13	.278	9	–	19	.321
Colgate	0	–	18	.000	1	–	24	.040
† 1986 ECAC North tournament winner Rankings from AP Poll

The 1986 America East men's basketball tournament was hosted by the higher seeds in head-to-head matchups. The final was held at Matthews Arena on the campus of the Northeastern University. Only the top-8 schools made it to the 1986 tournament, therefore excluding both Colgate and Hartford. Northeastern gained its third consecutive and fifth overall America East Conference Championship and an automatic berth to the NCAA tournament with its win over Boston University.

Northeastern was given the 13th seed in the East Regional of the NCAA Tournament and lost in the first round to Oklahoma 80–74. Boston University gained a bid to the NIT and lost in the first round to Providence 72–69.

== Bracket and Results ==
Quarterfinals
1	Northeastern	82
8	Vermont	61
4	Siena	82
5	Niagara	70
3	Boston University	69
6	New Hampshire	51
2	Canisius	89
7	Maine	76

Semifinals
1	Northeastern	89
4	Siena	75
3	Boston University	62
2	Canisius	61

Finals
1	Northeastern	63
3	Boston University	54

== See also ==
- America East Conference
