= 1983–84 Long Island Blackbirds men's basketball team =

American college basketball season

1983–84 Long Island Blackbirds men's basketball

ECAC Metro Regular Season and Tournament Champions

NCAA tournament, Play-in Round
- Conference: ECAC Metro
- Record: 20–11 (11–5 ECAC-M)
- Head coach: Paul Lizzo (10th season)
- Home arena: Schwartz Athletic Center

1983–84 ECAC Metro men's basketball standings
	Conf.				Overall
Team	W		L	PCT	W		L	PCT
Long Island †	11	–	5	.688	20	–	11	.645
Robert Morris	11	–	5	.688	17	–	13	.567
Fairleigh Dickinson	10	–	6	.625	17	–	12	.586
Loyola (MD)	10	–	6	.625	16	–	12	.571
Marist	8	–	8	.500	14	–	15	.483
Siena	8	–	8	.500	15	–	13	.536
Saint Francis (PA)	8	–	8	.500	12	–	15	.444
Wagner	5	–	11	.313	8	–	20	.286
St. Francis (NY)	1	–	15	.063	2	–	26	.071
† 1984 ECAC Metro tournament winner Rankings from AP Poll

The 1983–84 Long Island Blackbirds men's basketball team represented Long Island University during the 1983–84 NCAA Division I men's basketball season. The Blackbirds, led by head coach Paul Lizzo, played their home games at the Schwartz Athletic Center and were members of the ECAC Metro Conference. They finished the season 20–11, 11–5 in ECAC-M play to capture the regular season championship. They also won the ECAC Metro tournament to earn an automatic bid in the 1984 NCAA tournament where they lost in the play-in round to Northeastern, 90–87.

== Roster ==
1983–84 Long Island Blackbirds men's basketball team
Players	Coaches
Pos. / # / Name / Height / Weight / Year / Hometown; F / / Carey Scurry / 6 ft 7 in (2.01 m) / 185 lb (84 kg) / Jr / Brooklyn, New York	Head coach: Paul Lizzo; Assistant coach(es) Legend: (C) Team captain; (S) Suspended; (I) Ineligible; (W) Walk-on; Injured; Current redshirt

== Schedule and results ==
Date time, TV	Rank^{#}	Opponent^{#}	Result	Record	Site (attendance) city, state
Regular season
Nov ?, 1983*		John Jay	W 80–65	1–0	Athletic, Recreation & Wellness Center (1,487); Brooklyn, New York
Nov ?, 1983*		Dowling	W 91–43	2–0	Athletic, Recreation & Wellness Center (1,394); Brooklyn, New York
Dec 3, 1983*		at South Florida	L 64–88	2–1	Sun Dome (4,015); Tampa, Florida
Dec 6, 1983*		at George Mason	L 90–94	2–2	GMU Field House (2,000); Fairfax, Virginia
Dec 9, 1983*		at Tulsa; Golden Hurricane Classic	L 80–126	2–3	Tulsa Convention Center (8,714); Tulsa, Oklahoma
Dec 10, 1983*		vs. Oklahoma City; Golden Hurricane Classic	L 72–83	2–4	Tulsa Convention Center (8,720); Tulsa, Oklahoma
Dec 13, 1983*		at Providence	W 72–65	3–4	Providence Civic Center (4,424); Providence, Rhode Island
Dec ?, 1983*		CCNY	W 86–49	4–4	Athletic, Recreation & Wellness Center (1,112); Brooklyn, New York
Dec ?, 1983*		Concordia	W 81–67	5–4	Athletic, Recreation & Wellness Center (973); Brooklyn, New York
Dec 20, 1983		at Marist	L 71–75	5–5 (0–1)	McCann Arena (1,284); Poughkeepsie, New York
Dec 29, 1983*		St. Francis (NY)	W 76–74	6–5 (1–1)	Athletic, Recreation & Wellness Center (1,418); Brooklyn, New York
Jan 14, 1984		at Loyola (MD)	L 63–71	6–6 (1–2)	Evergreen Gym (1,102); Baltimore, Maryland
Jan 19, 1984		Robert Morris	W 70–64	7–6 (2–2)	Athletic, Recreation & Wellness Center (1,505); Brooklyn, New York
Jan 21, 1984		Saint Francis (PA)	W 100–78	8–6 (3–2)	Athletic, Recreation & Wellness Center (1,186); Brooklyn, New York
Jan 25, 1984		at Wagner	W 86–73	9–6 (4–2)	Sutter Gymnasium (700); Staten Island, New York
Jan 28, 1984		at Fairleigh Dickinson	W 88–78	10–6 (5–2)	FDU Gym (1,175); Hackensack, New Jersey
Jan 31, 1984*		at Monmouth	W 65–61	11–6	Boylan Gymnasium (903); West Long Branch, New Jersey
Feb 4, 1984		at St. Francis (NY)	W 88–81	12–6 (6–2)	Pope Physical Education Center (1,003); Brooklyn, New York
Feb 8, 1984		Siena	W 76–62	13–6 (7–2)	Athletic, Recreation & Wellness Center (1,373); Brooklyn, New York
Feb 11, 1984		Marist	W 81–71	14–6 (8–2)	Athletic, Recreation & Wellness Center (1,532); Brooklyn, New York
Feb 13, 1984*		Fordham	L 91–96	14–7	Athletic, Recreation & Wellness Center (1,562); Brooklyn, New York
Feb 15, 1984		at Siena	L 86–90	14–8 (8–3)	Alumni Recreation Center (2,217); Loudonville, New York
Feb 18, 1984		Loyola (MD)	L 84–95	14–9 (8–4)	Athletic, Recreation & Wellness Center (1,390); Brooklyn, New York
Feb 23, 1984		at Robert Morris	L 77–78	14–10 (8–5)	John Jay Center (1,281); Moon Township, Pennsylvania
Feb 25, 1984		at Saint Francis (PA)	W 74–63	15–10 (9–5)	Maurice Stokes Athletic Center (3,398); Loretto, Pennsylvania
Feb 29, 1984		Wagner	W 80–76	16–10 (10–5)	Athletic, Recreation & Wellness Center (1,012); Brooklyn, New York
Mar 3, 1984		Fairleigh Dickinson	W 81–79	17–10 (11–5)	Athletic, Recreation & Wellness Center (1,316); Brooklyn, New York
ECAC Metro tournament
Mar 8, 1984*		vs. St. Francis (NY); Quarterfinals	W 67–62	18–10	McCann Arena (1,854); Poughkeepsie, New York
Mar 9, 1984*		at Marist; Semifinals	W 64–55	19–10	McCann Arena (1,854); Poughkeepsie, New York
Mar 10, 1984*		vs. Robert Morris; Championship game	W 87–81	20–10	McCann Arena (1,287); Poughkeepsie, New York
NCAA tournament
Mar 13, 1984*	(11 E)	vs. (11 E) Northeastern; Play-in game	L 87–90	20–11	The Palestra (2,000); Philadelphia, Pennsylvania
*Non-conference game. ^{#}Rankings from AP poll. (#) Tournament seedings in parentheses. E=East. All times are in Eastern Time.
