= Omar Amanat =

Convicted felon and entrepreneur

- Born: 15 August 1972 (age 54)
- Education: Montville High School
- Occupations: Entrepreneur; Film Producer

Omar Sharif Amanat is an American entrepreneur, film producer, and investor in media, technology and hospitality companies. Amanat is the co-founder of Peak Group Holdings and Aman Resorts Group. He was convicted on charges of conspiracy in a scheme involving KIT Digital and its CEO in December 2017 and was sentenced to five years in prison.

== Education ==
Amanat grew up in Montville, New Jersey and was educated at Montville High School. He later enrolled at Franklin and Marshall College and transferred to the University of Pennsylvania.

== Career ==
He began at startup Datek Online and afterwards he moved to Texas and partnered with Philip Berber on a prototype online trading system called Cyber-Block, which was acquired by Charles Schwab for $488 million in 2000, before moving to New York to start Tradescape, of which he was the founder, chief executive and majority shareholder. In 2002, E*Trade acquired Tradescape for $276 million.

=== Entertainment industry ===
Amanat is the co-founder of Peak Group Holdings which is the largest shareholder of The Twilight Saga studio Summit Entertainment, in which he holds a 20% ownership stake via Peak Group Holdings. Brent Lang of The Wrap called him "the most powerful person in Hollywood you've never heard of". Summit was acquired by Hunger Games studio Lionsgate for $412.5 million and Peak became one of its largest shareholders, with a 48% stake.

He was the executive producer of the 2007 drama The Visitor and the 2008 comedy drama Smart People not including approximately 75 other films he financed via Summit Entertainment from 2007 to 2012.

=== Aman Resorts ===
In February 2014, Amanat co-founded with Adrian Zecha a new venture known as Aman Resorts Group Limited (ARGL) backed by a consortium of investors led by Vladislav Doronin. This new entity purchased luxury hotel and resort chain Aman Resorts from DLF for $358 million.

In July 2014, Amanat filed suit in the High Court of London against Vladislav Doronin, claiming Doronin committed breaches of a shareholders' agreement and forced the unlawful ouster of Adrian Zecha as CEO. Amanat claimed the decision to remove Zecha did not have board approval. The ruling, by the High Court, which was reviewed by The Wall Street Journal, reinstated Zecha as CEO, which was viewed as a victory for Amanat. Two days later, Doronin filed a counterclaim in New York, but the judge ruled that the lawsuit would have to be decided in England. In July 2014, London's High Court permitted a board decision which replaced Zecha with Olivier Jolivet to stand.

In March 2016 the High Court in London published an order which confirmed the settlement between Doronin and Amanat, ousting Amanat from the Aman Resorts ownership group.

== Litigation ==
Amanat has been involved in a number of high-profile lawsuits during his career: Shortly after the acquisition of Tradescape by E*Trade, litigation commenced between MarketXT and E*Trade alleging fraud on the part of the other. Summit Entertainment withdrew and retracted its threat against Amanat that he had "misrepresented that he's involved in the ownership, management, decision-making, and operations". Relating to the same Amanat filed libel proceedings against British newspapers who called him an imposter in relation to his claims of involvement with Summit Entertainment, which led to them apologising, publishing a retraction and making payments to a charity of Amanat's choice. Summit Entertainments's CEO and Chairman issued letters to Amanat confirming his ownership and control of a board seat. The disputes relating to the ownership and control of Aman Resorts have led to litigation in both New York and London. Amanat was also involved in lawsuits in connection with Bridges TV.

== Bankruptcy ==
In 2004 a bankruptcy petition was lodged against Amanat. The circumstances of the filing were highly unusual. Fortune reported the following transcript of Judge Alan Gropper:

You might certainly be interested in reading how Mr. Amanat started off his Chapter 7 case, which was absolutely extraordinary. He induced his chauffeur to file an involuntary petition against him on the theory that, well, in an involuntary [bankruptcy] he could get an automatic stay against a number of creditors who are going against him, but it wouldn't stop him from engaging in whatever transactions he wanted to ... I made no finding there that he had perjured himself ... on the first occasion that he appeared before this court. So I'm not saying I make any such finding now, but you can draw your own conclusions.

The bankruptcy petition was subsequently dismissed, as was a subsequent appeal against its dismissal by Amanat. Fortune also reported that "[b]efore the case was over, the bankruptcy judge, Gropper, found that Amanat executed fraudulent conveyances, deceived creditors, and backdated documents."

== Arrest and conviction ==
In July 2016 Amanat was arrested as part of the conspiracy case against former technology IPTV company KIT Digital. Prosecutors asserted that Amanat with Kaleil Isaza Tuzman, Stephen E. Maiden and an unnamed individual used an investment vehicle controlled by Tuzman to purchase KIT Digital shares. Maiden was sentenced in February 2015 to seven years in prison on a separate matter; Tuzman served time in prison in Colombia and was extradited to the U.S. to face charges. Former Chief Financial Officer Robin Smyth pleaded guilty to criminal charges in March 2016 and has been assisting prosecutors. Amanat previously sued Tuzman asserting breach of contract. The fraud trial commenced in October 2017. The prosecution accused Omanat of lying in their opening statements. Defense lawyers accused the prosecution's star witness Stephen E Maiden of having high-ranking DOJ ties and of losing most of his funds money before investing in Kit.

In December 2017, Amanat was found guilty of defrauding Kit investors along with his associate Kaleil Isaza Tuzman. Tuzman and Amanat had been accused of conspiring to inflate KIT's trading volume and share price between 2008 and 2011 in an effort to hide their losses. The verdict came after 6 weeks of trial. Three government witnesses who pleaded guilty, including two former KIT executives and a disgraced hedge-fund founder, told jurors of related frauds being directed by Tuzman and Amanat in an effort to hide their investment losses.

On 19 August 2021, Amanat was sentenced to five years in federal prison and fined $175,000. The 44 months already served pre-sentencing would be credited toward this sentence.

== Philanthropy ==
Amanat has been a board member of Human Rights Watch, Malaria No More, The Acumen Fund and the Ad Council and worked as a spokesman for Bridges TV before its debut, where he advocated for Muslims to undo negative misperceptions of themselves in media. He co-founded a film fund affiliated with the United Nations called the Alliance of Civilizations Media Fund Amanat commissioned Harvard Medical School to research the physiological effects on minorities who watch images of violence being perpetrated on fellow minorities.

He has been an executive producer of films including The Visitor, Darfur Now, Smart People, and The Mysteries of Pittsburgh.

== Personal life ==
He has three children with second wife Helena Houdová, and six children in total. He is the first cousin of Hillary Clinton's longtime aide Huma Abedin.
