= Kewego =

- Company type: Private
- Industry: Internet video sharing
- Founded: 2003
- Headquarters: Paris, France
- Key people: Michel Meyer, Co-founder; Olivier Heckmann, Co-founder
- Owner: KIT digital
- Number of employees: 40 (2007)
- Website: www.kewego.com multilingual

Kewego was a video platform provider website. The company is based in Paris, France. In early 2011, KIT digital purchased Kewego. Clients include brands such as Orange, eBay, Lycos, M6, and L'Equipe. Kewego also operates its own branded video sharing sites such as www.mykewego.com, www.mykewego.fr www.mykewego.co.uk, and so on.

== Background ==
Kewego was founded by Michel Meyer and Olivier Heckmann, two French entrepreneurs. They founded Multimania in 1995, which they subsequently floated on the French New Market at the Paris bourse in March 2000. It was later sold to Lycos for 220m Euros. Meyer and Heckmann then founded PulseVision in 2003, which was renamed Kewego in 2006.

== Features of the platform ==
The Kewego video platform is a white label video hosting platform. Kewego provides all software, hardware and bandwidth necessary to operate a video portal. Videos are converted to Flash Video format and the platform is provided with a branded Flash Video Player.

Kewego also offers a viral video placement/seeding service.
