= 1980–81 Holy Cross Crusaders men's basketball team =

American college basketball season

1980–81 Holy Cross Crusaders men's basketball

NIT tournament, Second round
- Conference: East Coast Athletic Conference
- Record: 20–10 (18–8 ECAC-N)
- Head coach: George Blaney (9th season)
- Home arena: Hart Center

1980–81 ECAC North men's basketball standings
	Conf.				Overall
Team	W		L	PCT	W		L	PCT
Northeastern †	21	–	5	.808	24	–	6	.800
Holy Cross	18	–	8	.692	20	–	10	.667
Vermont	15	–	11	.577	16	–	12	.571
Maine	13	–	13	.500	14	–	14	.500
Boston University	13	–	13	.500	13	–	14	.481
Canisius	11	–	15	.423	11	–	15	.423
Niagara	11	–	15	.423	11	–	15	.423
Colgate	11	–	17	.393	11	–	18	.379
New Hampshire	3	–	7	.300	7	–	19	.269
† 1981 ECAC North tournament winner

The 1980–81 Holy Cross Crusaders men's basketball team represented the College of the Holy Cross during the 1980–81 NCAA Division I men's basketball season. The Crusaders, led by head coach George Blaney, played their home games at the Hart Center and were members of the East Coast Athletic Conference – North. They finished the season 20–10, 18–8 in ECAC-South play to finish in second place.

== Roster ==
1980–81 Holy Cross Crusaders men's basketball team
Players
Coaches

Pos.	#	Name	Height	Weight	Year	Previous school	Hometown
C	42	Charlie Browne	6 ft 10 in (2.08 m)	230 lb (104 kg)	Sr	Tolentine	The Bronx, New York
F	40	Ward FitzPatrick	6 ft 6 in (1.98 m)	205 lb (93 kg)	Jr	Scranton Prep	Clarks Summit, Pennsylvania
G	10	Richie Guerin	6 ft 2 in (1.88 m)	175 lb (79 kg)	Fr	St. Mary's	Plandome Manor, New York
G	22	Kevin Greaney	6 ft 5 in (1.96 m)	180 lb (82 kg)	Jr	Nazareth	Brooklyn, New York
F	30	Chris Logan	6 ft 8 in (2.03 m)	205 lb (93 kg)	Sr	Bishop Ford	Brooklyn, New York
F	24	Dave Mulquin	6 ft 7 in (2.01 m)	205 lb (93 kg)	Sr	Georgetown Prep	Rockville, Maryland
G	21	Ed Thurman	6 ft 1 in (1.85 m)	175 lb (79 kg)	Jr	Lynn Classical	Lynn, Massachusetts
F	20	Garry Witts	6 ft 7 in (2.01 m)	185 lb (84 kg)	Sr	St. Joseph	Metuchen, New Jersey
G	12	Chris Zikos	5 ft 9 in (1.75 m)	175 lb (79 kg)	So	Worcester Academy	Winthrop, Massachusetts

Head coach

- George Blaney (Holy Cross)

Assistant coach(es)

Legend

- (C) Team captain
- (S) Suspended
- (I) Ineligible
- (W) Walk-on
- Injured
- Current redshirt

Roster

== Schedule ==
Date time, TV	Rank^{#}	Opponent^{#}	Result	Record	Site (attendance) city, state
Regular season
November 28*		Yale	W 99–69	1–0	Hart Recreation Center; Worcester, Massachusetts
December 3*		Navy	W 82–71	2–0	Hart Center; Worcester, Massachusetts
December 5*		Assumption	W 93–78	3–0	Hart Center; Worcester, Massachusetts
December 6*		South Alabama; Worcester County Classic	L 53–77	3–1	Hart Center; Worcester, Massachusetts
December 11*		at Harvard	W 72–46	4–1	Lavietes Pavilion; Cambridge, Massachusetts
December 20*		at Cincinnati	W 69–58	5–1	Riverfront Coliseum; Cincinnati, Ohio
December 22*		Davidson	W 96–79	6–1	Riverfront Coliseum; Cincinnati, Ohio
December 29*		at UNLV	L 75–92	6–2	Las Vegas Convention Center; Las Vegas, Nevada
December 30*		vs. Portland	L 70–73	6–3	Las Vegas Convention Center; Las Vegas, Nevada
January 6*		Xavier	W 112–93	7–3	Hart Center; Worcester, Massachusetts
January 8*		at Connecticut	L 57–66	7–4	Hugh S. Greer Field House; Storrs, CT
January 14*		Bentley	W 99–71	8–4	Hart Center; Worcester, Massachusetts
January 17*		at Iona	L 56–57 ^{OT}	8–5	Hynes Athletic Center; New Rochelle, NY
January 20*		St. Peter's	W 55–47	9–5	Hart Center; Worcester, Massachusetts
January 26*		at Dartmouth	W 70–58	10–5	
January 28*		Manhattan	W 82–70	11–5	Hart Center; Worcester, Massachusetts
January 30*		vs. Massachusetts	W 75–50	12–5	
January 31*		vs. Boston College	L 43–48	12–6	
February 3*		at Army	W 68–60	13–6	
February 7*		at Rhode Island	L 59–66	13–7	
Feb 12, 1981		at New Hampshire	W 87–84	14–7 (1–0)	
Feb 14, 1981*		Boston College	W 86–74	15–7	Hart Center; Worcester, Massachusetts
Feb 19, 1981*		vs. Fairfield	W 61–49	16–7	
Feb 21, 1981*		at Fordham	L 59–66	16–8	
Feb 25, 1981*		at Hofstra	W 73–63	17–8	
Feb 28, 1981*		Providence	W 67–58	18–8	Hart Center; Worcester, Massachusetts
ECAC North tournament
Mar 5, 1981*		vs. Maine; Semifinals	W 63–54	19–8	
Mar 7, 1981*		at Northeastern; Championship game	L 79–81 ^{OT}	19–9	Matthews Arena; Boston, Massachusetts
NIT tournament
Mar 12, 1981*		at Southern Miss; First round	W 56–54	20–9	Reed Green Coliseum; Hattiesburg, Mississippi
Mar 16, 1981*		at Syracuse; Second round	L 57–77	20–10	Carrier Dome; Syracuse, New York
*Non-conference game. ^{#}Rankings from AP Poll. (#) Tournament seedings in parentheses. All times are in Eastern Time.
