= Heidrick & Struggles =

American executive search and consultancy company

Heidrick & Struggles International Incorporated
- Type: Private
- Industry: Professional services
- Founded: Chicago, Illinois, 1953; 73 years ago
- Headquarters: Willis Tower; Chicago, Illinois, United States
- Key people: Tom Monahan, CEO; Tom Murray, President
- Services: Executive search, management consulting
- Revenue: ▲US $1,003.0 million (2021)
- Net income: ▲US $49.3 million (2018)
- Number of employees: 2,276 (2025)
- Website: www.heidrick.com

Heidrick & Struggles International Incorporated, commonly called Heidrick & Struggles, is an American executive search and management consulting company headquartered in Chicago, Illinois, United States, with offices in 56 cities across the Americas, Europe, Africa and Asia as of 2026.

== History ==
Heidrick & Struggles was founded in 1953 in Chicago by Gardner Heidrick and John E. Struggles, both of whom were former employees of American management consulting firm Booz Allen Hamilton.

From the late 1950s through the 1960s, Heidrick & Struggles opened offices in Los Angeles, San Francisco and New York City. In 1968, the firm established its first international office in London.

In 1999, the firm completed an initial public offering (IPO) and began trading on the NASDAQ under the ticker symbol HSII. On April 30, 1999, the IPO closed with 4.2 million shares offered at $14/share. As of 2005, the company had more than 50 offices in six continents.

In January 2013, Heidrick & Struggles purchased Senn Delaney Leadership Consulting Group, a Huntington Beach organizational culture advisory firm, in an all cash deal for $53.5 million.

In September 2017, Heidrick & Struggles acquired 2GET, an executive search firm in Brazil. In December 2021, the company entered into an agreement to acquire two executive search and leadership consulting companies, RosExpert in Russia and WE Partners in Ukraine and Kazakhstan.

In March 2022, the company posted global revenues of $1 billion.

In April 2021, the company acquired Business Talent Group, an online marketplace for on-demand independent consultants. In January 2023 Heidrick & Struggles acquired Atreus, an executive interim management firm based in Germany.

In 2024, the company appointed Tom Monahan as chief executive officer.

In December 2025, the company agreed to be acquired by an investor group led by Advent International and Corvex Private Equity, ending 26 years as a public company.

== Research studies ==
Heidrick & Struggles regularly conducts studies and research focused on industry trends.

In March 2026, Heidrick & Struggles found in their "Closing the CEO capability gap" study that, in 2025, one in five Fortune 500 companies appointed CEOs that had international work experience.

In April 2026, Heidrick & Struggles released the findings of their 2025 "Private Equity–Backed Chief Financial Officer Compensation Survey". The survey found that, on average, CFOs working in PE-backed firms in the United States took home cash pay of $604,000 in 2025, an increase of 5% year over year. That same month, the company released a report on "High-End Independent Talent." It found a 151% increase in demand for interim leaders since 2021, with human resources being the top business function seeking interim leadership support.

In May 2026, the company’s "CEO & Board Confidence Monitor" found that of the approximately 2,000 CEOs and directors surveyed, only four out ten expressed confidence that CEO succession planning had positioned organizations properly for the future.
