= 1983–84 St. Francis Terriers men's basketball team =

American college basketball season

1983–84 St. Francis Terriers men's basketball
- Conference: ECAC Metro
- Record: 2–26 (1–15 NEC)
- Head coach: Gene Roberti (5th season)
- Home arena: Generoso Pope Athletic Complex

1983–84 ECAC Metro men's basketball standings
| | Conf. | | | | Overall |
| Team | W | | L | PCT | W | | L | PCT |
|---|---|---|---|---|---|---|---|---|
| Long Island † | 11 | – | 5 | .688 | 20 | – | 11 | .645 |
| Robert Morris | 11 | – | 5 | .688 | 17 | – | 13 | .567 |
| Fairleigh Dickinson | 10 | – | 6 | .625 | 17 | – | 12 | .586 |
| Loyola (MD) | 10 | – | 6 | .625 | 16 | – | 12 | .571 |
| Marist | 8 | – | 8 | .500 | 14 | – | 15 | .483 |
| Siena | 8 | – | 8 | .500 | 15 | – | 13 | .536 |
| Saint Francis (PA) | 8 | – | 8 | .500 | 12 | – | 15 | .444 |
| Wagner | 5 | – | 11 | .313 | 8 | – | 20 | .286 |
| St. Francis (NY) | 1 | – | 15 | .063 | 2 | – | 26 | .071 |
† 1984 ECAC Metro tournament winner Rankings from AP Poll

The 1983–84 St. Francis Terriers men's basketball team represented St. Francis College during the 1983–84 NCAA Division I men's basketball season. The team was coached by Gene Roberti, who was in his fifth year at the helm of the St. Francis Terriers. The Terrier's home games were played at the Generoso Pope Athletic Complex. The team has been a member of the Northeast Conference since 1981, although at this time the conference was known as the ECAC Metro Conference.

The Terriers finished their season at 2–26 overall and 1–15 in conference play. During the regular season they lost 7 games by 2 points or less. The Terriers played in the conference tournament with the 8th seed, but lost in the opening round to LIU Brooklyn 62–67. At the end of the season, it was announced that Robert Jackson won a share the ECAC Metro Conference Player of the Year Award, along with Carey Scurry of LIU Brooklyn and Chipper Harris of Robert Morris.

This marked an all-time low record for the program and would stand until the 1993–94 season when the Terriers under Ron Ganulin went 1–26 overall and 1–17 in conference play. After the season, Gene Roberti was fired as the head coach, and was replaced by Bob Valvano.

== Roster ==
1983–84 St. Francis Brooklyn Terriers men's basketball team
Players
Coaches

| Pos. | # | Name | Height | Weight | Year | Previous school | Hometown |
|---|---|---|---|---|---|---|---|
| F | | Robert Jackson | 6 ft 8 in (2.03 m) | — | Sr |
| F | | Chris Phillips | 6 ft 4 in (1.93 m) | — | Jr |
| C | | Julian McKelly | 6 ft 10 in (2.08 m) | — | Jr | St. Esteban Episcopal School | Santo Domingo, Dominican Republic |
| F | | Theo Graham | 6 ft 6 in (1.98 m) | — | So |
| G | | Lenny LaGrua | 6 ft 1 in (1.85 m) | — | So |
| G | | Brian LaGrua | 6 ft 2 in (1.88 m) | — | So |
| G | | Jerome Washington | 5 ft 10 in (1.78 m) | — | So |
| G | | Jim Paguaga | 6 ft 0 in (1.83 m) | — | So |
| F | | Jerome Scott | 6 ft 6 in (1.98 m) | — | Fr |
| F | | Dickens Benoit | 6 ft 3 in (1.91 m) | — | Fr |
| F | | Blaine Drayton | 6 ft 5 in (1.96 m) | — | Fr |
| G | | Tim Brisco | 6 ft 1 in (1.85 m) | — | Fr |

Head coach

- Gene Roberti

Assistant coach(es)

Legend

- (C) Team captain
- (S) Suspended
- (I) Ineligible
- (W) Walk-on
- Injured
- Current redshirt

== Schedule and results ==
| Date time, TV | Opponent | Result | Record | Site (attendance) city, state |
Regular season
| November , 1983* | at Boston University | L 56–80 | 0–1 | Case Gym (659); Boston, MA |
| November , 1983* | at Manhattan | L 59–60 | 0–2 | Draddy Gymnasium (1,980); Bronx, NY |
| December __, 1983* | Utica | L 58–60 | 0–3 | Generoso Pope Athletic Complex (314); Brooklyn, NY |
| December , 1983* | Saint Peter's | L 72–92 | 0–4 | Generoso Pope Athletic Complex (244); Brooklyn, NY |
| December , 1983* | at Notre Dame | L 49–71 | 0–5 | Edmund P. Joyce Center (8,693); South Bend, IN |
| December , 1983* | Maine | L 66–81 | 0–6 | Generoso Pope Athletic Complex (417); Brooklyn, NY |
| December 12, 1983* | at Fordham | L 61–77 | 0–7 | Rose Hill Gymnasium (1,011); Bronx, NY |
| December , 1983* | at Canisius | L 69–70 | 0–8 | Koessler Athletic Center (1,652); Buffalo, NY |
| December __, 1983 | at Long Island | L 74–76 | 0–9 (0–1) | Schwartz Athletic Center (1,418); Brooklyn, NY |
| January 4, 1984* | at Clemson | L 63–97 | 0–10 | Littlejohn Coliseum (4,500); Clemson, SC |
| January __, 1984 | Siena | L 73–74 | 0–11 (0–2) | Generoso Pope Athletic Complex (414); Brooklyn, NY |
| January __, 1984 | at Marist | L 62–79 | 0–12 (0–3) | McCann Arena (522); Poughkeepsie, NY |
| January __, 1984 | at Loyola (MD) | L 73–79 | 0–13 (0–4) | Reitz Arena (837); Baltimore, MD |
| January __, 1984* | Iona | L 73–90 | 0–14 | Generoso Pope Athletic Complex (911); Brooklyn, NY |
| January __, 1984 | Saint Francis (PA) | L 78–86 | 0–15 (0–5) | Generoso Pope Athletic Complex (263); Brooklyn, NY |
| January __, 1984 | Robert Morris | L 53–71 | 0–16 (0–6) | Generoso Pope Athletic Complex (256); Brooklyn, NY |
| January __, 1984 | at Fairleigh Dickinson | L 70–81 | 0–17 (0–7) | (817); Rutherford, NJ |
| January 28, 1984 | at Wagner | W 84–74 | 1–17 (1–7) | Sutter Gymnasium (450); Staten Island, NY |
| February __, 1984* | Adelphi | W 80–69 | 2–17 | Generoso Pope Athletic Complex (617); Brooklyn, NY |
| February 4, 1984 | Long Island; Battle of Brooklyn | L 81–88 | 2–18 (1–8) | Generoso Pope Athletic Complex (1,003); Brooklyn, NY |
| February __, 1984 | Marist | L 59–76 | 2–19 (1–9) | Generoso Pope Athletic Complex (384); Brooklyn, NY |
| February __, 1984 | at Siena | L 78–91 | 2–20 (1–10) | Alumni Recreation Center (2,104); Loudonville, NY |
| February __, 1984 | Loyola (MD) | L 66–79 | 2–21 (1–11) | Generoso Pope Athletic Complex (279); Brooklyn, NY |
| February __, 1984 | at Saint Francis (PA) | L 79–86 | 2–22 (1–12) | Maurice Stokes Athletic Center (2,117); Loretto, PA |
| February __, 1984 | at Robert Morris | L 65–80 | 2–23 (1–13) | John Jay Center (1,059); Moon Township, PA |
| February __, 1984 | Fairleigh Dickinson | L 63–64 | 2–24 (1–14) | Generoso Pope Athletic Complex (391); Brooklyn, NY |
| February __, 1984 | Wagner | L 66–67 | 2–25 (1–15) | Generoso Pope Athletic Complex (399); Brooklyn, NY |
ECAC Metro tournament
| March 8, 1984 | vs. LIU Brooklyn; Quarterfinal | L 62–67 | 2–26 | McCann Center (2,250); Poughkeepsie, NY |
*Non-conference game. ^{#}Rankings from AP Poll. (#) Tournament seedings in parentheses. All times are in Eastern Time.
