= Tom Monahan =

US businessman

- Monahan in 2025
- Born: Thomas L. Monahan III
- Education: Harvard University, New York University Stern School of Business
- Title: CEO of Heidrick & Struggles
- Spouse: Sharon Kerrie Marcil

Tom Monahan is an American businessman and chief executive officer (CEO) of global leadership advisory firm Heidrick & Struggles. Monahan also serves as managing partner of Norton Street Holdings and was previously president and CEO of DeVry University. He currently serves on the boards of Johns Hopkins Health System, the Boys & Girls Clubs of America, and The Nature Conservancy of MD and DC.

== Early life and education ==
Monahan grew up in Weymouth, Massachusetts. He holds degrees from Harvard University and New York University Stern School of Business.

== Career ==
Prior to 1996, Monahan was a senior consultant at the Deloitte & Touche Consulting Group, a director at the Committee for Economic Development, and a staff consultant at Andersen Consulting.

Monahan joined the leadership team of CEB (formerly the Corporate Executive Board) in 1996.

He joined CEB’s Board of Directors in 2001 and was appointed Chief Executive Officer (CEO) in 2005 and Chairman in 2008. He presided over an expansion of revenue, which increased 157% from 2005 to 2016.

In August 2016, Monahan announced his intention to step down from his position, four months before Gartner announced the acquisition of CEB for $2.6 billion in a transaction with a total enterprise value of $3.3bn.

Monahan served as Executive Chairman of digital services company ProKarma from May 2019 to January 2022, which coincided with Concentrix’s acquisition.

In August 2020, he was appointed president and CEO of DeVry University.

In June 2023, Monahan was appointed chief executive officer (CEO) of global leadership advisory firm Heidrick & Struggles.

Monahan has also served as a board member of TransUnion (NYSE: TRU), where he is the Chair of its Audit & Compliance Committee and a member of its Nominating and Governance Committee. He is also the executive vice chair of the DeVry University Board of Trustees. Monahan serves on the Advisory Board of Golub Capital Nonprofit Board Fellows Network.

He is also the former board member of Workforce Logiq (a Carlyle Group portfolio company; Winsight (an HPS Capital portfolio company; and, until its October 2018 sale, Convergys (NYSE: CVG), where he served as Chair of the Compensation Committee.

He has contributed several articles on business topics, including for CNBC, Fortune, and Harvard Business Review. He wrote a column in The Washington Post called “Talent Matters."

=== Non-profits ===
Monahan is involved in the non-profit sector, serving on the boards of the Johns Hopkins Health System and the Boys & Girls Clubs of America. He is also a trustee for The Nature Conservancy of Maryland and DC and a member of The Economic Club of Washington, D.C.

== Personal life ==
Monahan is married to Sharon Kerrie Marcil, who graduated from Duke University and received an M.B.A. from Harvard University. Marcil is the North America regional chair at the Boston Consulting Group.
