= Nayana LaFond =

- Born: 1981 (age 44–45)
- Citizenship: Métis Nation of Ontario; United States
- Occupations: Artist; activist; curator
- Children: 1

Nayana LaFond (born 1981) is an American painter, sculptor, and curator of Anishinaabe, and Métis descent. A citizen of Métis Nation of Ontario, in 2020, she began the Portraits in RED: Missing & Murdered Indigenous People Painting Project, a series of over 110 portraits created to raise awareness for the Missing and Murdered Indigenous Women (MMIW) crisis. The collection, which features black and white acrylic paintings with red symbolic accents, has been exhibited at institutions including the Southern Vermont Arts Center and the University of Massachusetts Amherst. LaFond operates the project on a non-profit basis, gifting the original works to the subjects or their families.

== Early life and education ==
LaFond was born 1980 or 1981 She is of Anishinaabe, and Métis descent, with ancestral ties to tribes primarily in Ontario. She is a citizen of the Métis Nation of Ontario.

LaFond studied painting and photography in college and holds an Associates in Visual Arts from Greenfield Community College. LaFond is currently a Frances Perkins Scholar at Mount Holyoke College.

== Career ==
LaFond worked as a curator for eight years at the Whitney Center of the Arts in Pittsfield, Massachusetts. Her professional background also includes running an independent record label and owning a cafe in Turners Falls. As an artist, she began as a semi-abstract painter working in color before transitioning to black and white media. Her switch to black and white was motivated in part by the lower cost of materials.

LaFond is a sculptor. Her large-scale sculpture related to domestic abuse was constructed from concrete and rebar. The piece, which is approximately the size of a car, was displayed near Fenway Park.

=== Portraits in RED ===
LaFond began the Portraits in RED: Missing & Murdered Indigenous People Painting Project on May 5, 2020, the National Day of Awareness for Missing and Murdered Indigenous Women and Girls. At the time, she was in quarantine during the COVID-19 pandemic. The project began when LaFond saw a selfie posted by a woman from Saskatchewan, in a Facebook group called "Social Distance Powwow". LaFond asked permission to paint her portrait, and after posting the finished work online, she received a significant response. Following the release of a second portrait she received 25 requests from community members on the first day alone, leading her to commit to painting everyone who sent her a request.

The portraits are typically created using acrylic on canvas in black and white, with the color red used as a symbolic accent, often in the form of a handprint over the mouth. LaFond uses red because, in many Indigenous cultures, it is believed to be the only color spirits can see, allowing the portraits to be visible to the ancestors. The red handprint symbolizes the silencing of Indigenous women, the blood of the people, and their resilience.

LaFond operates the project on a non-profit basis. She does not charge for the portraits or accept money for them, though she has previously accepted donations of art supplies. The original paintings are offered to the subjects or their families, who may choose to keep, sell, or donate the works.

By October 2021, LaFond had completed 62 portraits, and by March 2024, the series had grown to 110 works. As of 2024, LaFond was in the process of winding down the series. Lafond states this decidion is based on a desire for the work to not be exploited. She also sites being uncomfortable with the attention she received as the artist and felt it detracted from the message. The collection has been exhibited at various institutions, including the Pacific Maritime Heritage Center in Oregon, the Southern Vermont Arts Center, the LAVA Center in Greenfield, Massachusetts, and the Augusta Savage Gallery at the University of Massachusetts Amherst.

== Personal life ==
As of November 2023, she was 42 years old. She is a leukemia survivor who underwent a bone marrow transplant in 2014. She has a daughter.
