= Startup.com =

2001 documentary film

- Theatrical release poster
- Directed by: Jehane Noujaim; Chris Hegedus
- Produced by: D.A. Pennebaker
- Starring: Tom Herman; Kaleil Isaza Tuzman
- Cinematography: Jehane Noujaim
- Edited by: Chris Hegedus; Erez Laufer; Jehane Noujaim
- Production companies: Pennebaker Hegedus Films; Noujaim Films
- Distributed by: Artisan Entertainment
- Release dates: January 21, 2001 (Sundance); May 11, 2001 (United States)
- Running time: 106 minutes
- Country: United States
- Language: English
- Box office: $1.8 million

Startup.com is a 2001 American documentary film directed by Jehane Noujaim and Chris Hegedus, with D. A. Pennebaker serving as a producer on the film. It follows the dot-com start-up govWorks.com, which raised $60 million in funding from Hearst Interactive Media, KKR, the New York Investment Fund, and Sapient.

The startup did not survive, but it became a reference for lessons learned, as it was the subject of a 2001 documentary that follows govWorks founders Kaleil Isaza Tuzman and Tom Herman from 1999 to 2000, as the Internet bubble was bursting.

The film had its world premiere at the Sundance Film Festival on January 21, 2001. It was released on May 11, 2001, by Artisan Entertainment.

== Production ==
The film was produced by D. A. Pennebaker, and was directed by Chris Hegedus and Jehane Noujaim. Noujaim had been Kaleil Tuzman's Harvard classmate and began filming Tuzman as he quit his job at Goldman Sachs, to begin govWorks with his high school friend Tom Herman. Noujaim contacted Hegedus and Pennebaker for help in financing the project. The film was distributed by Artisan Entertainment (which was later acquired by Lions Gate Entertainment).

The film was shot in digital video. The filmmakers shot for over two years, and were editing the more than 400 hours of video and film right up to their Sundance Film Festival premiere in early 2001. They re-edited the last few minutes of the film just prior to its May 2001 theatrical release.

Since the film's release, Herman and Tuzman worked together again at Recognition Group and JumpTV. In 2017, Tuzman was convicted of multiple counts of fraud and market manipulation in connection with his business KIT Digital.

== Reception ==
=== Critical response ===
Startup.com received positive reviews from film critics. On Rotten Tomatoes it holds a 93% approval rating, based on 94 reviews, with an average rating of 7.55/10. The site's critical consensus reads, "Startup.com is more than just a look at the rise and fall of the new economy. At its center is a friendship being tested to the limit, and that's what makes it worth viewing." On Metacritic, the film has a score of 75 out of 100, based on reviews from 32 critics, indicating "generally favorable reviews".

David Rooney of Variety called it a "timely, topical film, which goes beyond its potentially dry diet of facts to incorporate the juicy human drama of Machiavellian manipulations, ambition, torn loyalties and crushing betrayal."

== See also ==
- e-Dreams
- Startup company
- Venture capital
