= 1990–91 Northeastern Huskies men's basketball team =

American college basketball season

1990–91 Northeastern Huskies men's basketball

North Atlantic Conference Regular-season Champion North Atlantic Conference tournament champion

NCAA tournament, first round
- Conference: North Atlantic Conference
- Record: 22–11 (8–2 NAC)
- Head coach: Karl Fogel (5th season)
- Home arena: Matthews Arena

1990–91 North Atlantic Conference men's basketball standings
	Conf.				Overall
Team	W		L	PCT	W		L	PCT
Northeastern †	8	–	2	.800	22	–	11	.667
Maine	7	–	3	.700	13	–	16	.448
Boston University	5	–	5	.500	11	–	18	.379
Vermont	5	–	5	.500	15	–	13	.536
Hartford	5	–	5	.500	13	–	16	.448
New Hampshire	0	–	10	.000	3	–	25	.107
† 1991 NAC tournament winner

The 1990–91 Northeastern Huskies men's basketball team represented Northeastern University during the 1990–91 college basketball season. Led by head coach Karl Fogel, the Huskies competed in the North Atlantic Conference and played their home games at Matthews Arena. They finished the season 22–11, 8–2 in NAC play to win the regular season conference title. They followed the regular season by winning the North Atlantic Conference tournament to earn a bid to the NCAA tournament.

== Roster ==
1990–91 Northeastern Huskies men's basketball team
Players	Coaches
Pos. / # / Name / Height / Weight / Year / Hometown; F / / Dexter Jenkins / 6 ft 3 in (1.91 m) / — / Sr	Head coach: Karl Fogel; Assistant coach(es) Legend: (C) Team captain; (S) Suspended; (I) Ineligible; (W) Walk-on; Injured; Current redshirt

== Schedule and results ==
Date time, TV	Rank^{#}	Opponent^{#}	Result	Record	Site city, state
Regular season
Nov 23, 1990*		vs. No. 8 Indiana; Maui Invitational	L 78–100	0–1	Lahaina Civic Center; Lahaina, Hawaii
Nov 24, 1990*		vs. Loyola Marymount; Maui Invitational	W 152–123	1–1	Lahaina Civic Center; Lahaina, Hawaii
Nov 25, 1990*		vs. Toledo; Maui Invitational	L 78–82	1–2	Lahaina Civic Center; Lahaina, Hawaii
Nov 27, 1990*		at US International	W 97–86	2–2	Golden Hall; San Diego, California
Dec 1, 1990*		Rhode Island	L 70–76	2–3	Matthews Arena; Boston, Massachusetts
Dec 3, 1990*		Howard	W 100–95	3–3	Matthews Arena; Boston, Massachusetts
Dec 5, 1990*		at Providence	L 73–88	3–4	Providence Civic Center; Providence, Rhode Island
Dec 9, 1990*		Delaware	W 84–70	4–4	Matthews Arena; Boston, Massachusetts
Dec 17, 1990*		Eastern Illinois	W 85–65	5–4	Matthews Arena; Boston, Massachusetts
Dec 19, 1990*		at George Mason	W 82–67	6–4	Patriot Center; Fairfax, Virginia
Dec 28, 1990*		vs. Georgia Southern	L 63–65	6–5	
Dec 29, 1990*		vs. Monmouth	L 59–66	6–6	
Jan 5, 1991*		at VCU	W 61–59	7–6	Richmond Coliseum; Richmond, Virginia
Jan 8, 1991*		Niagara	W 73–66	8–6	Matthews Arena; Boston, Massachusetts
Jan 12, 1991		at Maine	W 60–56	9–6 (1–0)	Alfond Arena; Orono, Maine
Jan 16, 1991*		at Drexel	W 98–90	10–6	Daskalakis Athletic Center; Philadelphia, Pennsylvania
Jan 19, 1991*		Northwestern	W 84–79	11–6	Matthews Arena; Boston, Massachusetts
Jan 21, 1991*		Tulane	W 79–73	12–6	Matthews Arena; Boston, Massachusetts
Jan 23, 1991		at Hartford	L 79–86	12–7 (1–1)	Chase Arena at Reich Family Pavilion; Hartford, Connecticut
Jan 26, 1991		at Boston University	W 81–70	13–7 (2–1)	Case Gym; Boston, Massachusetts
Jan 31, 1991*		at Miami (FL)	L 63–79	13–8	Miami Arena; Miami, Florida
Feb 2, 1991		at Vermont	L 76–77	13–9 (2–2)	Patrick Gym; Burlington, Vermont
Feb 5, 1991		New Hampshire	W 57–39	14–9 (3–2)	Matthews Arena; Boston, Massachusetts
Feb 7, 1991*		at Army	W 66–47	15–9	Christl Arena; West Point, New York
Feb 11, 1991*		at Fairleigh Dickinson	L 66–78	15–10	Rothman Center; Hackensack, New Jersey
Feb 16, 1991		Hartford	W 70–64	16–10 (4–2)	Matthews Arena; Boston, Massachusetts
Feb 19, 1991		Maine	W 82–73	17–10 (5–2)	Matthews Arena; Boston, Massachusetts
Feb 23, 1991		at New Hampshire	W 73–57	18–10 (6–2)	Lundholm Gym; Durham, New Hampshire
Feb 26, 1991		Vermont	W 78–69	19–10 (7–2)	Matthews Arena; Boston, Massachusetts
Mar 3, 1991		Boston University	W 77–70	20–10 (8–2)	Matthews Arena; Boston, Massachusetts
NAC Tournament
Mar 6, 1991*		Hartford; Semifinal	W 74–59	21–10	Matthews Arena; Boston, Massachusetts
Mar 7, 1991*		Maine; Championship Game	W 57–46	22–10	Matthews Arena; Boston, Massachusetts
NCAA Tournament
Mar 15, 1991*	(16 E)	vs. (1 E) No. 4 North Carolina; First Round	L 66–101	22–11	Carrier Dome; Syracuse, New York
*Non-conference game. ^{#}Rankings from AP poll. (#) Tournament seedings in parentheses. E=East.
