= Kevin Ziomek =

American baseball player (born 1992)

- Pitcher
- Born: March 21, 1992 (age 33); Amherst, Massachusetts, U.S.
- Bats: Right Throws: Left
- Stats at Baseball Reference

Kevin Matthew Ziomek (born March 21, 1992) is an American former professional baseball pitcher who played for the Detroit Tigers organization.

== Career ==
=== Amateur ===
Ziomek attended Amherst Regional High School in Amherst, Massachusetts. As a senior, he was the Massachusetts Gatorade Baseball Player of the Year.

Ziomek was drafted by the Arizona Diamondbacks in the 13th round of the 2010 Major League Baseball draft, but did not sign and attended Vanderbilt University to play college baseball. He played at Vanderbilt for the Commodores from 2011 to 2013. During his three years he appeared in 63 games with 38 starts. He went 19–9 with a 3.04 earned run average (ERA) and 241 strikeouts in 243 innings. After the 2011 and 2012 seasons, he played collegiate summer baseball with the Cotuit Kettleers of the Cape Cod Baseball League.

=== Professional ===
Ziomek was drafted by the Detroit Tigers in the second round of the 2013 Major League Baseball draft. He signed with the Tigers rather than return to Vanderbilt for his senior season. Ziomek made his professional debut that season with the Connecticut Tigers. He started four games, going 0–1 with a 4.50 ERA. Ziomek played the 2014 season with the West Michigan Whitecaps. He started 23 games, going 10–6 with a 2.27 ERA and 152 strikeouts in 123 innings.

On September 17, 2015, Ziomek was named the Detroit Tigers' Pitching Prospect of the Year by MLB Pipeline. Ziomek played the 2015 season with the Lakeland Flying Tigers, where he posted a 9–11 record, with a 3.43 ERA over 27 starts and 154 2/3 innings, including two complete games. He allowed just three home runs all season to go with 34 walks and 143 strikeouts.

Ziomek retired from baseball prior to the start of the 2017 season. He sat out almost the entire 2016 season after undergoing arm surgery in 2016. Following surgery, he failed to regain the speed on his fastball he had prior forcing him to retire.
