= David F. M. Brown =

American emergency medicine specialist

David F. M. Brown is an American physician, emergency medicine specialist, teacher, researcher, and administrator. He is the MGH Trustees Endowed Professor of Emergency Medicine at Harvard Medical School and served as Chief of the Department of Emergency Medicine at Massachusetts General Hospital. from 2013-2021 when he became President of Massachusetts General Hospital. In 2024, his role was expanded to President, Academic Medical Centers, Mass General Brigham, overseeing both Massachusetts General and Brigham and Women’s Hospitals.

== Education ==
Brown graduated magna cum laude from Princeton University in 1985 with a degree in Chemistry. He was a member of Phi Beta Kappa. He earned an MD from Columbia University College of Physicians & Surgeons in 1989 and was a member of Alpha Omega Alpha. He trained at Massachusetts General Hospital and is certified by the American Board of Emergency Medicine and the American Board of Internal Medicine.

== Clinical career ==
Brown joined the faculty in emergency medicine at Harvard Medical School (HMS) and Massachusetts General Hospital (MGH) in 1992. In 2001, he became the Department's vice chair and in 2013 he was promoted to MGH Chairman. In 2014, he was promoted to Professor at HMS. In 2016, he was installed as the inaugural incumbent of the MGH Trustees Endowed Professorship at Harvard.

Brown is an expert in cardiovascular emergencies and has authored more than 250 scientific papers, reviews, and chapters. He served as the inaugural editor in chief of Scientific American: Emergency Medicine and is the author of two textbooks. He has lectured and taught all over the country and around the world. He has been recognized with numerous teaching and mentoring awards locally at Massachusetts General Hospital and at Harvard Medical School. He has also won national and international recognition for teaching, mentoring, and research. He has been a Trustee of Cooley Dickinson Hospital since 2013. In 2021, he became the interim President and CEO of Cooley Dickinson Health Care. Later in 2021 Brown became President of Massachusetts General Hospital.
