= Nkem Ojougboh =

Nigerian basketball player

Personal information
- Born: August 11, 1987 (age 39) Benin City, Nigeria
- Listed height: 6 ft 9 in (2.06 m)
- Listed weight: 225 lb (102 kg)

Career information
- High school: Scottsdale Christian Academy (Phoenix, Arizona)
- College: UTSA (2005–2006); Northeastern (2006–2010)
- NBA draft: 2010: undrafted
- Playing career: 2010–2013
- Position: Center
- Number: 54

Career history
- 2010–2011: Utah Flash
- 2011–2012: Tulsa 66ers
- 2013: Ebun Comets

Nkem-Nkechukwu Ojougboh (born August 11, 1987) is a Nigerian professional basketball player. He was drafted in the second round (ninth pick) at the 2010 NBA Development League Draft by the Utah Flash, an affiliate of the Utah Jazz and Atlanta Hawks. Collegiately, Ojougboh played for the Northeastern University Huskies men's basketball team from 2007 to 2010 and for the University of Texas San Antonio in 2005. He played for the NBA Development League team Utah Flash in the 2010/11 NBA D-League season, and for the Tulsa 66ers in 2011/12. Ojougboh was named to the CAA All-Academic First Team from 2005 to 2008. Ojougboh is the son of Cairo Ojougboh and Grace Ojougboh. He has two brothers Omam Ojougboh, Orieka Ojougboh and a sister Rimma Ojougboh. Out of high school, Ojougboh committed to the University of Texas at San Antonio, after also being recruited by Boise State, Cornell University, Harvard University, Arizona State University and Washington State. He transferred to Northeastern after his Freshman campaign at University of Texas San Antonio.

== Collegiate career statistics ==
Year	Team	GP	GS	MPG	FG%	3P%	FT%	RPG	APG	SPG	BPG	PPG
Freshman (2005–2006)	Texas San-Antonio	28	6	22.0	48.1	-	61.5	3.5	0.7	0.4	0.9	6.8
Sophomore (2007–2008)	Northeastern	31	31	31.0	43.0	50.0	68.9	6.4	1.2	0.7	0.9	9.9
Junior (2008–2009)	Northeastern	32	29	26.9	53.9	-	66.3	4.6	1.1	0.4	0.8	7.4
Senior (2009–2010)	Northeastern	33	33	33.2	55.5	20.0	69.7	7.2	1.1	0.7	2.3	9.2

== Professional career statistics ==
Year	Team	GP	GS	MPG	FG%	3P%	FT%	RPG	APG	SPG	BPG	PPG
NBA D-League (2010–2011)	Utah Flash	48	-	17.1	51.1	-	68.7	4.7	0.9	0.5	1.2	5.1
NBA D-League (2011–2012)	Tulsa 66ers	23	-	21.7	45.6	-	65.7	5.5	0.9	0.4	1.7	6.0
