= GovWorks =

Software Company

govWorks Inc. was a dot-com company founded in 1998 by Kaleil Isaza Tuzman, Tom Herman, and Chieh Cheung. It went bankrupt when the dot-com bubble burst in 2000. The company's history is documented in the 2001 documentary Startup.com. Originally known as Public Data Systems, the company was producing software that assisted government clients in tracking contracts and overseeing purchasing functions. However, as the Internet boom accelerated, the company transitioned toward becoming an Internet web portal.

During the company's existence, New York state and towns such as Grand Island expressed interest in its services. The Economist's survey found that people preferred online payments of government-owed fees due to the convenience. Nevertheless, govWorks was unable to overcome many of the challenges that startups usually face, resulting in CNET ranking it as one of the top ten dot-com failures of the time.

In January 2018, the govWorks website was re-launched under new ownership. The current iteration of govWorks is related to its predecessor in name only, while it expedites passports and travel visas.

== History ==
govWorks was founded in May 1998, with eight employees, and was originally known as Public Data Systems. The service delivery model for govWorks was inspired by Tuzman, after he found a two-year-old parking ticket in his New York City apartment. govWorks offered a service that enabled citizens to pay municipal fees through its internet portal. In October 1999, the initial launch of govWorks.com online services began in pre-selected markets in Massachusetts and Connecticut, with a full-scale rollout planned for early 2000.

The company aimed to provide a web portal that enables citizens in local communities to access or pay for city services, apply for jobs, or receive community information. However, factors including but not exhaustive to mismanagement, capital demands, pressure for speed products to the market, and poor service execution contributed to the company's failure. In January 2001, Tuzman and investors sold the company to First Data Corporation. According to public statements by co-founder Tom Herman, govWorks had used approximately $60 million in venture capital during its three years of existence.

The number of employees rapidly increased, reaching 30 by August 1998, and 70 by October 1998. The company expanded further as additional capital investment was secured when the company neared its full-scale rollout in 2000. The company's employee headcount grew from 120 in January 2000 to over 250 employees in April 2000. However, govWorks was dealing with internal power struggles and governance issues that contributed to its demise.

By late 2000, as losses mounted and the company failed to meet its service targets, workforce reductions began. In November 2000, govWorks reduced its staff to 60 employees in an effort to reduce its $1 million per month in overhead costs. In January 2001, the company was sold to First Data Corporation.

== Documentary ==
The rise and fall of govWorks was chronicled in the documentary film Startup.com, released by Artisan in May 2001, which won the Grand Prize at the 2001 Sundance Film Festival, and earned $765,000 in initial box office receipts.

== Competitors ==
One of govWorks' main competitors was Atlanta-based EzGov.com, which offered software to local governments and municipalities, allowing citizens to pay parking tickets, taxes, and obtain other city services online 24 hours a day. EzGov co-founder Bryan Mundy was invited by Tuzman to tour govWorks offices before either company released their software; this visit was shown in Startup.com. On January 15, 2001, Mundy died of smoke inhalation during a fire in Mundy's Atlanta, Georgia home.

In addition to EzGov, govWorks faced other competitors offering similar services at lower or no cost through alternative financing models, in contrast with govWorks' client-funded approach.

== Bankruptcy filing ==
In March 2001, govWorks.com officially filed for Chapter 11 bankruptcy protection. At the time of filing, govWorks listed approximately $8 million in assets and $40 million in liabilities, having raised over $70 million through venture capital. In 2017, Boalt Holdings, LLC acquired the domain and brand assets.

== Current ownership ==
In January 2018, the govWorks website was relaunched under new ownership, offering a software platform that allowed companies to provide passport application creation services to United States passport holders.
