= Kaleil Isaza Tuzman =

American businessman

- Born: October 1971 (age 55); Boston, Massachusetts, US
- Education: Harvard University
- Known for: Convicted felon, Former Businessman, Former Entrepreneur, Co-founder of govWorks.com, subject of documentary Startup.com (2001)

Kaleil Isaza Tuzman is a former digital media entrepreneur and businessman who was convicted of multiple counts of fraud and market manipulation in 2017.

In 1998 Tuzman and Tom Herman co-founded the Internet start-up GovWorks.com, raising $60 million in venture capital funding; the company subsequently went bankrupt after the dot-com bubble burst in 2000. The rise and fall of GovWorks was the subject of the 2001 documentary Startup.com. He went on to start his own investment firm, Recognition Group, later renamed KIT Capital (after his own initials). Tuzman was president and COO of JumpTV from 2005 to 2007. In late 2007, after acquiring a majority share in ROO Group, a video aggregator, he changed the company's name to KIT Digital, Inc. and was CEO and chairman until its bankruptcy in 2013. On September 7, 2015, he was arrested in Colombia and held in a Bogotá prison until being extradited to the United States to face charges of fraud and market manipulation in connection with the defrauding of investors in KIT Digital and two investment funds. He was convicted on all counts in December 2017.

== Business career ==
Tuzman started at Brown University and transferred to Harvard University starting his sophomore year. After graduating from Harvard, Tuzman worked for five years at Goldman Sachs, before launching govWorks, Inc., an Internet startup, along with his childhood friend Tom Herman. As the company's CEO, Tuzman raised $60 million in venture capital. Following the burst of the "dot-com bubble" govWorks was sold to First Data Corp. for nearly $12 million, which did not cover the over $35 million in debt. The journey from the company's founding to its sale was chronicled in a documentary Startup.com (2001), which premiered at the Sundance Film Festival in 2001.

Tuzman then founded Recognition Group (later called KIT Capital), a company aimed at providing exit strategies, financial restructuring, and interim management for distressed companies. Among dozens of projects, KIT Capital managed the sale of Tigris Corp., a privately held strategic sourcing and supply chain consultancy based in New York City, to Verticalnet, Inc. in 2004.In 2001, KIT Capital/Recognition Group took over KPE, a struggling web development subsidiary of Grey Global Group, where Tuzman took the role of the CEO and chairman. He sold the company to Mobilocity, Inc. (which was subsequently sold to Agency.com) less than a year later.

In May 2005, Tuzman was brought in as the president and COO of JumpTV, a Canadian start-up that focused on delivering foreign Internet Protocol Television (IPTV) content. Under his leadership, the company grew to become a leading company in delivery of syndicated foreign television content over the Internet around the globe. In August 2006, Tuzman JumpTV's IPO, with Morgan Stanley as the lead underwriter, raised over $60 million; they raised an additional $100 million in a secondary offering, less than a year later. In late 2007, Tuzman sold in the public market a substantial portion of his shareholding interest in JumpTV, which subsequently floundered.

In late 2007, Tuzman purchased a controlling interest in ROO Group and became the company's CEO and chairman of the board. After financial restructuring and key acquisitions ROO, an Internet video technologies company, became one of the leading end-to-end IP video providers under the new name of KIT Digital. KIT Digital listed on the NASDAQ Global Market in August 2009 under the ticker "KITD". Tuzman left KIT Digital in April 2012. After his departure, Tuzman made public bids to acquire the company in several open letters to KIT Digital's board of directors, saying that he believed the company was being purposefully mismanaged to bankruptcy by insiders.

== Arrest and conviction ==
On Monday, September 7, 2015, Tuzman was arrested in Colombia on charges of accounting fraud; the following day, KIT Digital's former chief financial officer, Robin Smyth, was arrested in Australia. Together with Omar Amanat and Stephen Maiden, manager of the Maiden Capital hedge fund, they were charged with a series of crimes related to three criminal "schemes". First, with respect to Maiden Capital, between February 2009 and June 2012 Amanat and others carried out a scheme to conceal the fact that firm clients suffered losses from an investment in Enable Invest Ltd, a hedge fund run by Amanat's brother for which he had raised capital using a series of misrepresentations. The second scheme involved a market manipulation involving the shares of KIT Digital (KITD). Maiden, at the request of Tuzman and Amanat, had driven up the price of KITD's shares when the company was seeking to raise money and shortly before the shares were listed on NASDAQ. The third scheme involved an accounting fraud that took place over a two-year period beginning in 2010. This scheme, designed to fraudulently inflate the revenue of KITD, involved the use of improper revenue recognition and sham round trip transactions. KIT Digital filed for bankruptcy in 2013 and is now known as Piksel, Inc.

Following his arrest, Tuzman was transferred between three prisons, including La Picota prison in Bogotá where he awaited extradition. The conditions at La Picota prompted his legal team to file a complaint with the Inter-American Commission for Human Rights (part of the Organization of American States), which was signed by over 150 other inmates citing numerous abuses such as lack of medical care, lack of running water, extortion, etc. The complaint has been acknowledged by the commission and has resulted in an investigation into the Colombian prison system.

He was extradited to the United States, and at his bail hearing in July 2016, Tuzman claimed to have few assets left and significant liabilities, but prosecutors noted that Tuzman was wearing a $70,000 watch and the judge doubled his bail to $5 million. Tuzman's trial for 20 charges of fraud, wire fraud, conspiracy to commit fraud, false statements in SEC reports, and manipulative and deceptive practices, began on October 30, 2017.

Smyth and another former KIT executive had earlier pleaded guilty and become government witnesses, as had Stephen Maiden. Over the course of a six-week trial they detailed the fraud for the jury, including the roles of Tuzman and Amanat in orchestrating it. In December 2017, Tuzman and Amanat were found guilty on all charges (in Tuzman's case, market manipulation conspiracy, wire fraud conspiracy relating to defrauding KIT Digital shareholders, and accounting fraud conspiracy relating to KIT Digital). On October 12, 2018, the court adjourned sentencing for a Fatico hearing (weighing evidence of misdeeds submitted by the prosecution to bear on sentencing) on April 2, 2019. On September 10, 2021, he was sentenced to three years of probation; the judge explained that he didn't assign further prison time due to Tuzman's claims to have been raped/sexually assaulted in prison in Colombia.

== Civil suits ==
In the years between leaving KIT Digital and his arrest, Tuzman sought to develop a luxury hotel called "Convento Obra Pia" in Colombia. While awaiting sentencing for the KIT Digital convictions, Tuzman was sued by investors in the hotel project who accused him of stealing $5.4 million. As of May 2021, this suit was outstanding. Also in May 2021, a similar suit was filed in U.S. federal court, asking for $6 million. Tuzman has countersued his investors without success.

== Books and other media ==
In 2004, Tuzman published a book The Entrepreneur's Success Kit: A 5-Step Lesson Plan to Create and Grow Your Own Business.

In 2020, he created and began hosting a radio show called Equal Footing With Dov Tuzman.
