= Piksel =

Professional service and technology provider

Piksel S.r.L.
- Industry: IPTV
- Founded: 1 January 2008
- Headquarters: Milan, Italy
- Key people: Hans-Juergen Maas; CEO; Peter Heiland; Director; Matteo Pella; Head of Business Development
- Website: piksel.com

Piksel S.r.L. is an Italian software development and technology services company headquartered in Milan, Italy. The company provides custom software development, system integration, content management, and digital media solutions to clients across the public sector, media and entertainment, telecommunications, and travel industries.

Piksel has been operational for over 20 years and employs more than 150 professionals across offices in Milan and Ispra (Varese).

Piksel formerly went by the name of KIT Digital until filing for bankruptcy in April 2013. Upon emerging from bankruptcy in August 2013, the company changed its name to Piksel.

== Services and Specialties ==
Piksel organises its offering into three service lines and four specialties.

=== Services ===
- Application Development: Piksel develops business-to-business (B2B) and business-to-consumer (B2C) applications for web, iOS, and Android platforms. The development process includes requirements definition, UX/UI design using Figma, cloud-based backend architecture, quality assurance, and post-launch analytics. Backend developers work with cloud-native architectures on AWS and Microsoft Azure.
- System Integration Services: The company designs and implements system integration solutions for business applications, including user interface design, API integration, and software architecture definition. Piksel supports both on-premise and cloud-native deployments and places particular emphasis on cybersecurity throughout the integration process.
- Content Management System (CMS): Piksel offers CMS solutions both through its proprietary VCMS platform and through third-party platform expertise. The company has documented experience with Wordpress and headless CMS architectures, as well as greenfield CMS development.

=== Specialties ===
- Artificial Intelligence and Machine Learning: Piksel applies AI and ML in two principal areas: Large Language Models (LLMs) for content creation and editorial workflows, and Machine Learning for predictive analytics and workflow optimisation. The company works with GPT-based model architectures and integrates AI capabilities into existing business processes.
- Website Development: Services span front-end and back-end development, UX and responsive design, web hosting and deployment (AWS, Azure), CI/CD pipeline configuration, performance optimisation, and emerging technologies including Progressive Web Apps (PWAs), web security, and SEO.
- Application Development: iOS development capabilities include Swift, Objective-C, SwiftUI, UIKit, Xcode, RESTful APIs, and GraphQL. Android development is carried out in Kotlin and Java, using the Android SDK, Jetpack libraries, and Jetpack Compose.
- Video Streaming Solutions: Piksel has more than 20 years of experience in digital video streaming, working with broadcasters and media companies on content management, transcoding, metadata handling, and multi-platform distribution. The company has delivered platforms for Sky, Mediaset, AT&T, and Channel 4, covering capabilities including digital rights management, recommendation engines, and ad insertion. Deployment options include cloud, on-premises, and hybrid architectures.

== European Commission and Public Sector ==
The company has maintained a technology partnership with the European Commission's Joint Research Centre (JRC) at Ispra for over 15 years, contributing to multinational research consortia and science-driven IT initiatives. Piksel's Ispra office is co-located within the JRC's geographic area, supporting close operational collaboration.

== KIT Digital History ==
In late 2007, Kaleil Isaza Tuzman purchased a controlling interest in ROO Group and became the company's CEO and chairman of the board. ROO Group changed its name to KIT Digital in 2008 after a financial restructuring of the company.

KIT Digital embarked on a growth by acquisition strategy and quickly acquired a number of players in the digital media and IP video industry. In 2008, they acquired, Sputnik Agency, Visual Connection, Kamera and Morpheum. In 2009, Narrowstep, Nunet, The FeedRoom and Juzou. KIT Digital was listed on the NASDAQ Global Market in August 2009 under the ticker "KITD". The key acquisitions enabled KIT Digital to become one of the largest video software and service providers in the world. In September 2009, KIT Digital moved its global headquarters from Dubai, UAE to its European head office and technical operations hub in Prague, Czech Republic, citing the European zone now represents in excess of 50% of the company's revenue stream.

In 2010 the company bought the Atlanta-based live event broadcaster Multicast Media Technologies and later went on to buy more broadcast and media asset management companies, including Benchmark Broadcast Systems, Megahertz Broadcast Systems, Accela Communications, and Brickbox Digital Media. By October that year, KIT digital was estimated to control 25% of a US$500 million market for Internet video-management software.

In January 2011, they spent approximately $77.2 million to purchase three social software and video companies, Kewego, KickApps, and Kyte and KickApps CEO Alex Blum was appointed to the new position of Global COO of KIT Digital to manage worldwide operations. A few months later KIT spent over $100 million to purchase TXT Polymedia for $34.4 million and IT software services company ioko for approximately $74 million in cash and 1,509,805 restricted shares of KIT common stock, totaling $91.4 million.

=== Subsequent collapse ===
On November 21, 2012, the company announced errors that would force the restatement of prior period financial statements and postponement of Q3 2012 results. The 2009, 2010 and 2011 years and 1Q12 and 2Q12 will be restated; KITD says investors should no longer rely upon previously issued statements for those periods. The company says an event of default exists in a secured loan facility that has $11 million outstanding; that its cash balance has dwindled to $10.6 million, and that cash burn is expected to continue. As a result, KIT is exploring "a broad set of strategic alternatives," including financing deals (virtually guaranteed to be dilutive) and a sale. It's also cancelling its 2012 shareholder meeting. Shares traded more than 50% down in after hours trading. The company announced on December 10, 2012, that it has received notice from NASDAQ, because it has not yet filed 3Q results with the SEC. The company no longer complies with the continued listing requirements under Nasdaq. The NASDAQ stock market announced on December 11, 2012, that trading of NASDAQ:KITD shares was halted.

KITD announced on April 16, 2013, that it would file for bankruptcy on April 24 with a debt plan supported by three of the largest shareholders. The company's last financial statements listed a revenue of $107.3 million for the six months ended June 30, resulting in a $110.8 million loss from operations, including a $55 million goodwill-impairment charge. Jones Day, with a claim of $1.6 million for legal services, is shown as the largest unsecured creditor. The case is IN RE Chapter 11. KIT Digital, Inc., Case No. 13-11298 U.S. Bankruptcy Court, Southern District of New York (Manhattan).

Isaza Tuzman left KIT digital in April 2012.

=== Criminal actions ===
The collapse of KIT Digital led to a number of arrests, broadly alleging that the share price was fraudulently inflated by seeking to buy the company's shares with the company's own money through an investment vehicle controlled by Kaleil Isaza Tuzman. Stephen Maiden was sentenced in February 2015 to seven years in prison. In July 2016 Omar Amanat was arrested as part of the criminal case. Kaleil Isaza Tuzman served time in prison in Colombia and was eventually extradited to the United States.

In December 2017, both Tuzman and Amanat were found guilty of defrauding Kit investors. Tuzman and Amanat had been accused of conspiring to inflate KIT's trading volume and share price between 2008 and 2011 in an effort to hide their devastating losses. The verdict came after six weeks of trial. Three government witnesses who pleaded guilty, including two former KIT executives and a disgraced hedge-fund founder, told jurors of related frauds being directed by Tuzman and Amanat in an effort to hide their disastrous investment losses.

== Customers ==
Piksel's clients have included Airbus, the Associated Press, AT&T, BBC, BSkyB, Channel 4, Disney-ABC, Google, Hewlett-Packard, Lastminute.com, Mediaset, MFE (MediaForEurope), MTV, News Corp, RSC MediaGroup, Sky Deutschland, Sky Italia, Telecom Argentina, TIM (Tim Vision), O_{2}, Universal Studios, Verizon, Vodafone, and Volkswagen.

== Certifications ==
Piksel holds the following internationally recognised management system certifications:

- ISO 9001 - Quality Management Systems
- ISO 14001 - Environmental Management Systems
- ISO 27001 - Information Security Management

== See also ==
- IPTV
- Broadband TV
- Social TV
- Content management system
- Mobile content
