= Mark Halsel =

American basketball player

Personal information
- Born: November 8, 1962 (age 63) Pittsburgh, Pennsylvania, U.S.
- Listed height: 6 ft 6 in (1.98 m)
- Listed weight: 210 lb (95 kg)

Career information
- High school: Schenley (Pittsburgh, Pennsylvania)
- College: Northeastern (1980–1984)
- NBA draft: 1984: 4th round, 77th overall pick
- Drafted by: Chicago Bulls
- Playing career: 1984–1990
- Position: Small forward

Career history
- 1984–1985: Bay State Bombardiers
- 1985: Lancaster Lightning
- 1985: Detroit Spirits
- 1989–1990: Grand Rapids Hoops

Career highlights
- AP honorable mention All-American (1984); America East Player of the Year (1984); 3× First-team All-America East (1982–1984); America East tournament MVP (1984)
- Stats at Basketball Reference

Mark Halsel (born November 8, 1962) is an American former basketball player. He played college basketball for the Northeastern Huskies and is a member of the Northeastern University athletics Hall of Fame.

Halsel played for the Huskies from 1980 to 1984 and when his career was over he had the most rebounds in school history (1,115), and is the only NU player to top both 1,000 points (1,651) and 1,000 rebounds. Halsel also holds the distinction for being on the first ever NCAA men's basketball tournament team in the 1981 season. Halsel was a two time All-New England selection, along with being All-East, All-District, and Honorable Mention All-American. Bobby Knight invited Halsel to the 1984 Olympic Trials where he was beat out by Michael Jordan and Chris Mullin for a spot on the squad. Halsel played professional basketball around the world for seven seasons after leaving Northeastern and was a 1984 NBA draft pick of the Chicago Bulls in the fourth round.

He played two stints in the Continental Basketball Association (CBA) in the 1984–85 and 1989–90 seasons. He averaged 7.6 points and 3.4 rebounds in 18 games for the Bay State Bombardiers, Lancaster Lightning, Detroit Spirits and Grand Rapids Hoops.
