= Karl Fogel =

American basketball coach

Biographical details
- Born: December 6, 1946 (age 79)
- Education: Colby College

Coaching career (HC unless noted)
- 1976–1979: Curry
- 1979–1986: Northeastern (assistant)
- 1986–1994: Northeastern
- 1995–2003: Mercyhurst

Head coaching record
- Overall: 270–249

Accomplishments and honors

Championships
- 4 ECAC North/NAC regular season (1987, 1990, 1991, 1993); 2 ECAC North/NAC tournament (1987, 1991)

Awards
- NAC Coach of the Year (1987)

Karl Fogel (December 9, 1946) is an American former college basketball coach at Curry College, Northeastern, and Mercyhurst.

== Coaching career ==
Fogel's first head coaching job came at Curry College, where he amassed a 33–40 record from 1976 to 1979. In 1979, Fogel joined Jim Calhoun's staff at Northeastern, and was a part of five NCAA Tournament appearances, as well as six regular season conference titles before taking over the head coaching position when Calhoun left for Connecticut. In his first season at the helm, Fogel coached the Reggie Lewis-led Huskies to a 27–7 record an ECAC North regular season and tournament title, and a bid to the 1987 NCAA tournament. Fogel became the first coach in conference history to win the conference tournament and go to the NCAA tournament in his first season on the job.

In his next four seasons at Northeastern, Fogel guided the Huskies to a winning record, including a regular season title during the 1989-90 season, and a regular season and conference tournament title in 1990–91 and an appearance in the 1991 NCAA tournament. In the three seasons that followed, Fogel's record was 34–49 and was subsequently fired and replaced by Northeastern alum Dave Leitao.

After Northeastern, Fogel became the head coach at Mercyhurst, where he stayed until 2003, accumulating an overall record of 106–106.

Upon leaving coaching, Fogel became the athletic director at Westwood High School in Massachusetts, serving in the role until 2011 after being placed on administrative leave following an incident involving the firing of the school's track and field coach.

== Head coaching record ==
Record table
| Season | Team | Overall | Conference | Standing | Postseason |
|---|---|---|---|---|---|
Curry Colonels () (1976–1979)
| 1976–77 | Curry | 9–15 | N/A | N/A | |
| 1977–78 | Curry | 13–11 | N/A | N/A | |
| 1978–79 | Curry | 11–14 | N/A | N/A | |
| Curry: | | 33–40 (.452) | N/A | | |
Northeastern Huskies (ECAC North/North Atlantic Conference) (1986–1994)
| 1986–87 | Northeastern | 27–7 | 17–1 | 1st | NCAA Division I First Round |
| 1987–88 | Northeastern | 15–13 | 11–7 | 5th | |
| 1988–89 | Northeastern | 17–11 | 12–5 | 3rd | |
| 1989–90 | Northeastern | 16–12 | 9–3 | 1st | |
| 1990–91 | Northeastern | 22–11 | 8–2 | 1st | NCAA Division I First Round |
| 1991–92 | Northeastern | 9–19 | 5–9 | 5th | |
| 1992–93 | Northeastern | 20–8 | 12–2 | T–1st | |
| 1993–94 | Northeastern | 5–22 | 2–12 | 8th | |
| Northeastern: | | 131–103 (.560) | 76–41 (.650) | | |
Mercyhurst Lakers (Great Lakes Intercollegiate Athletic Conference) (1995–2003)
| 1995–96 | Mercyhurst | 15–12 | 11–7 | T–4th | |
| 1996–97 | Mercyhurst | 13–13 | 7–10 | 5th (South) | |
| 1997–98 | Mercyhurst | 16–11 | 9–8 | T–2nd (South) | |
| 1998–99 | Mercyhurst | 11–15 | 5–14 | 7th (South) | |
| 1999–00 | Mercyhurst | 9–17 | 4–15 | 7th (South) | |
| 2000–01 | Mercyhurst | 17–10 | 11–6 | 3rd (South) | |
| 2001–02 | Mercyhurst | 13–13 | 6–11 | 6th (South) | |
| 2002–03 | Mercyhurst | 12–15 | 4–12 | 6th South | |
| Mercyhurst: | | 106–106 (.500) | 47–83 (.362) | | |
| Total: | | 270-249 (.520) | | | |
National champion Postseason invitational champion Conference regular season champion Conference regular season and conference tournament champion Division regular season champion Division regular season and conference tournament champion Conference tournament champion
