= Perry Moss (basketball) =

American basketball player (born 1958)

Personal information
- Born: November 11, 1958 (age 68) Tucson, Arizona, U.S.
- Listed height: 6 ft 2 in (1.88 m)
- Listed weight: 185 lb (84 kg)

Career information
- High school: Amherst Regional (Amherst, Massachusetts)
- College: Northeastern (1978–1982)
- NBA draft: 1982: 3rd round, 69th overall pick
- Drafted by: Boston Celtics
- Playing career: 1982–1989
- Position: Point guard
- Number: 2, 9, 10

Career history
- 1982–1983: Maine Lumberjacks
- 1983–1984: Bay State Bombardiers
- 1985: Tampa Bay Thrillers
- 1985: Washington Bullets
- 1985–1986: Philadelphia 76ers
- 1986–1987: Golden State Warriors
- 1987–1988: Pensacola Tornados
- 1988: La Crosse Catbirds
- 1989: Topeka Sizzlers

Career highlights
- CBA champion (1985); CBA All-Defensive Second Team (1984); ECAC North Player of the Year (1982); 2× ECAC North tournament MVP (1981, 1982)

Career NBA statistics
- Points: 536 (3.9 ppg)
- Rebounds: 210 (1.5 rpg)
- Assists: 198 (1.5 apg)
- Stats at NBA.com
- Stats at Basketball Reference

Perry Victor Moss (born November 11, 1958) is an American former National Basketball Association (NBA) player.

== Playing career ==
=== College ===
Moss played basketball at Northeastern University under coach Jim Calhoun, where he averaged 15.2 points per game and 3.7 rebounds per game in four seasons there. In his senior season, Moss was named the America East Conference Player of the Year in 1981–82. Moss graduated as the school's second-leading career scorer with 1,722 points and a 15.2 average in 113 games. In 1982, he went head-to-head with future NBA All-Star Dominique Wilkins and the Georgia Bulldogs in the first round of the Gotten State Classic. Despite a big game from Moss, the Huskies lost, but Los Angeles Lakers General Manager Jerry West, who was in attendance, noted that Moss was the best guard he had seen that year.

On his home court, Moss would dazzle the fans with his acrobatic dunks created by his 41-inch vertical leap. As a junior in 1981, Moss teamed with guard Pete Harris to lead the Huskies to their first of seven conference titles. His career included a number of clutch shots, including Moss's halfcourt bomb that sent the championship game versus Holy Cross into overtime, which Northeastern won 76–69. He also hit a last-second shot in the opening round of the NCAA tournament when Northeastern knocked off 20th ranked Fresno State before bowing out to Utah. Moss and the Huskies repeated the feat a year later, as Moss averaged 23.7 points per game. Northeastern defeated Saint Joseph's 63–62 in the first round, before dropping a triple-overtime contest to Villanova in the second round. Moss scored 23 and 31 points respectively, in those two games. For his career, Moss scored over 30 points eight times.

=== Professional ===
Moss was drafted with the 23rd pick in the third round of the 1982 NBA draft by the Boston Celtics, but he was released before playing a single game. Prior to the 1983-84 NBA season Moss was signed by the New Jersey Nets, but was once again released before playing a single game. He played three years in the Continental Basketball Association (CBA) and was selected to the CBA All-Defensive Second Team in 1984. He won a CBA championship with the Tampa Bay Thrillers in 1985. He made his NBA debut for the Washington Bullets in the 1985-86 NBA season. He was released mid-season. Moss finished the 1985–86 season by playing for the Philadelphia 76ers. After the season, Moss was once again released, but he did play for the Golden State Warriors in 1986–87. On September 27, 1989, he was signed by the Orlando Magic, but was waived before the start of the regular season. In total, he played in 136 NBA games and averaged 3.9 points and 1.5 assists.

Moss spent the next decade playing with a string of CBA teams, including the La Crosse Catbirds and the Topeka Sizzlers (1988–1989), Rockford Lightning (1991–1992), Yakima Sun Kings (1993–1994), Hartford HellCats (player/coach 1994–1995), and the Connecticut Pride (player/coach 1995–1996).

In all he played on ten CBA teams in eleven years, and finished his CBA career in 1995 playing for the Connecticut Pride team that also featured future UConn coach Kevin Ollie in his rookie season. At the age of 39, he finished his final professional basketball season in 1997 playing for the Norwich Neptunes of the Atlantic Basketball Association.

== Personal ==
He is the brother of Peter Moss, a former college player for Brown who was the 1980 Ivy League Player of the Year. They also have a sister, Paula Moss, who graduated in 1982 as Tufts University's all-time leading scorer with 1,018 points (since surpassed).

== Career statistics ==
Legend
GP	Games played	GS	Games started	MPG	Minutes per game
FG%	Field goal percentage	3P%	3-point field goal percentage	FT%	Free throw percentage
RPG	Rebounds per game	APG	Assists per game	SPG	Steals per game
BPG	Blocks per game	PPG	Points per game	**Bold**	Career high

=== NBA ===
==== Regular season ====
Year	Team	GP	GS	MPG	FG%	3P%	FT%	RPG	APG	SPG	BPG	PPG
1985–86	Washington	12	0	13.3	.396	**.286**	**.733**	**2.1**	**1.6**	.5	**.3**	**4.6**
1985–86	Philadelphia	60	0	**14.2**	.397	.200	.730	1.5	1.5	**.8**	.2	4.2
1986–87	Golden State	**64**	0	10.9	**.440**	.071	.710	1.5	1.4	.7	.0	3.6
Career		136	0	12.6	.415	.174	.722	1.5	1.5	.7	.1	3.9

==== Playoffs ====
Year	Team	GP	GS	MPG	FG%	3P%	FT%	RPG	APG	SPG	BPG	PPG
1986	Philadelphia	7	0	4.0	.250	.000	**1.000**	.4	.3	.0	**.1**	.7
1987	Golden State	**8**	0	**5.6**	**.571**	**1.000**	.889	**.6**	**.6**	**.8**	.0	**3.1**
Career		15	0	4.9	.455	.500	.900	.5	.5	.4	.1	2.0

== Honors ==
Moss was inducted into the New England Basketball Hall of Fame as part of its Class of 2013.
