= Drug interaction =

Change in the action or side effects of a drug caused

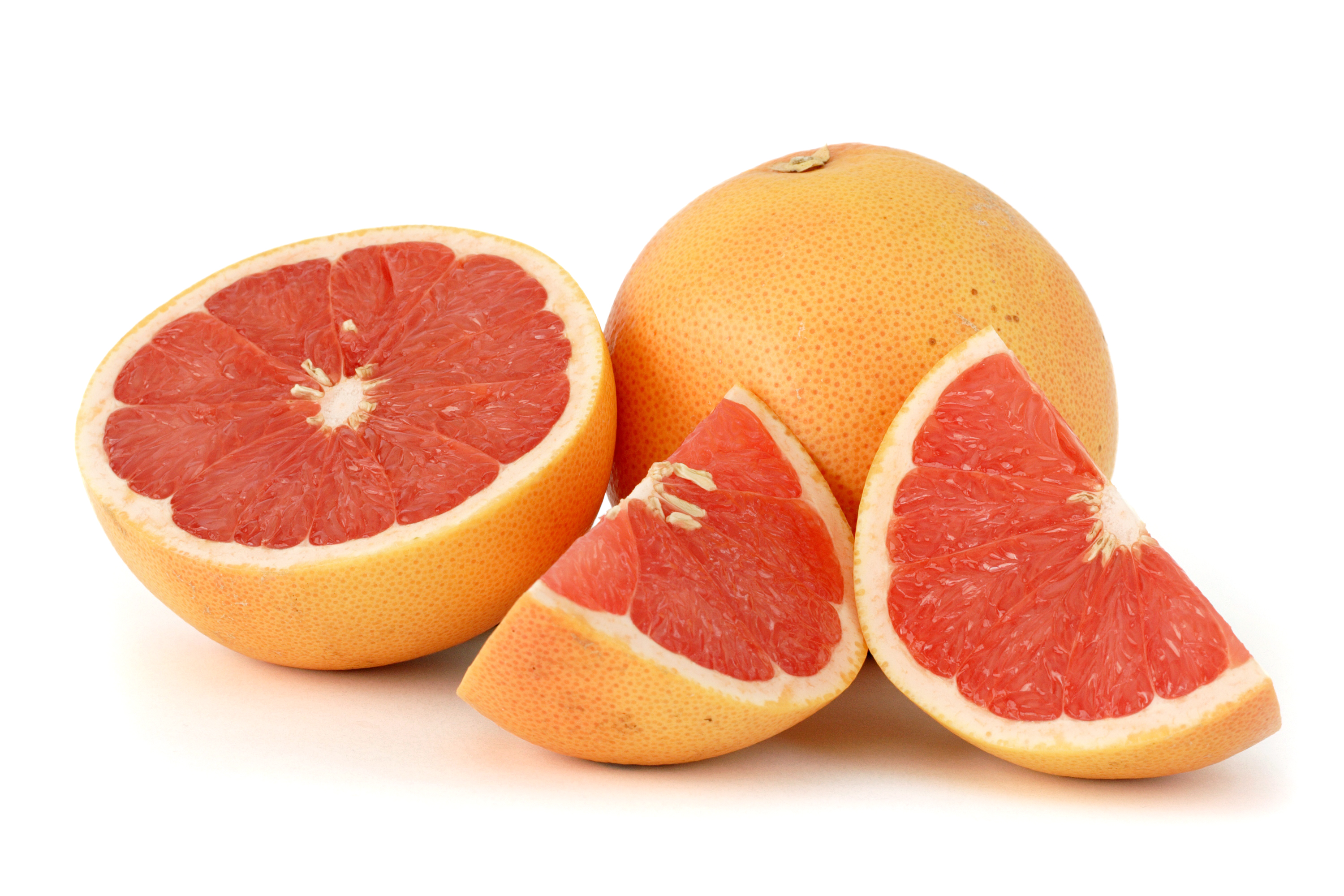
Grapefruit juice can act as an enzyme inhibitor, affecting the metabolism of drugs.

In pharmaceutical sciences, drug interactions occur when a drug's mechanism of action is affected by the concomitant administration of substances such as foods, beverages, or other drugs. A popular example of drug–food interaction is the effect of grapefruit on the metabolism of drugs.

Interactions may occur by simultaneous targeting of receptors, directly or indirectly. For example, both Zolpidem and alcohol affect GABA_{A} receptors, and their simultaneous consumption results in the overstimulation of the receptor, which can lead to loss of consciousness. When two drugs affect each other, it is a drug–drug interaction (DDI). The risk of a DDI increases with the number of drugs used.

A large share of elderly people regularly use five or more medications or supplements, with a significant risk of side-effects from drug–drug interactions.

Drug interactions can be of three kinds:

- additive (the result is simply the expected effect of each drug taken independently),
- synergistic (combining the drugs leads to a larger effect than expected), or
- antagonistic (combining the drugs leads to a smaller effect than expected).

It may be difficult to distinguish between synergistic or additive interactions, as individual effects of drugs may vary.

Direct interactions between drugs are also possible and may occur when two drugs are mixed before intravenous injection. For example, mixing thiopentone and suxamethonium can lead to the precipitation of thiopentone.

== Interactions based on pharmacodynamics ==
Pharmacodynamic interactions are the drug–drug interactions that occur at a biochemical level and depend mainly on the biological processes of organisms. These interactions occur due to action on the same targets; for example, the same receptor or signaling pathway.

Effects of the competitive inhibition of an agonist by increases in the concentration of an antagonist. A drug's potency can be affected (the response curve shifted to the right) by the presence of an antagonistic interaction.

Pharmacodynamic interactions can occur on protein receptors. Two drugs can be considered to be homodynamic, if they act on the same receptor. Homodynamic effects include drugs that act as (1) pure agonists, if they bind to the main locus of the receptor, causing a similar effect to that of the main drug, (2) partial agonists if, on binding to a secondary site, they have the same effect as the main drug, but with a lower intensity and (3) antagonists, if they bind directly to the receptor's main locus but their effect is opposite to that of the main drug. These may be competitive antagonists, if they compete with the main drug to bind with the receptor. or uncompetitive antagonists, when the antagonist binds to the receptor irreversibly. The drugs can be considered heterodynamic competitors, if they act on distinct receptor with similar downstream pathways.

The interaction my also occur via signal transduction mechanisms. For example, low blood glucose leads to a release of catecholamines, triggering symptoms that hint the organism to take action, like consuming sugary foods. If a patient is on insulin, which reduces blood sugar, and also beta-blockers, the body is less able to cope with an insulin overdose.

== Interactions based on pharmacokinetics ==
Pharmacokinetics is the field of research studying the chemical and biochemical factors that directly affect dosage and the half-life of drugs in an organism, including absorption, transport, distribution, metabolism and excretion. Compounds may affect any of those process, ultimately interfering with the flux of drugs in the human body, increasing or reducing drug availability.

=== Based on absorption ===
Drugs that change intestinal motility may impact the level of other drugs taken. For example, prokinetic agents increase the intestinal motility, which may cause drugs to go through the digestive system too fast, reducing absorption.

The pharmacological modification of pH can affect other compounds. Drugs can be present in ionized or non-ionized forms depending on pKa, and neutral compounds are usually better absorbed by membranes. Medication like antacids can increase pH and inhibit the absorption of other drugs such as zalcitabine, tipranavir and amprenavir. The opposite is more common, with, for example, the antacid cimetidine stimulating the absorption of didanosine. Some resources describe that a gap of two to four hours between taking the two drugs is needed to avoid the interaction.

Factors such as food with high-fat content may also alter the solubility of drugs and impact its absorption. This is the case for oral anticoagulants and avocado. The formation of non-absorbable complexes may occur also via chelation, when cations can make certain drugs harder to absorb, for example between tetracycline or the fluoroquinolones and dairy products, due to the presence of calcium ions. . Other drugs bind to proteins. Some drugs such as sucralfate bind to proteins, especially if they have a high bioavailability. For this reason its administration is contraindicated in enteral feeding.

Some drugs also alter absorption by acting on the P-glycoprotein of the enterocytes. This appears to be one of the mechanisms by which grapefruit juice increases the bioavailability of various drugs beyond its inhibitory activity on first pass metabolism.

=== Based on transport and distribution ===
Drugs also may affect each other by competing for transport proteins in plasma, such as albumin. In these cases the drug that arrives first binds with the plasma protein, leaving the other drug dissolved in the plasma, modifying its expected concentration. The organism has mechanisms to counteract these situations (by, for example, increasing plasma clearance), and thus they are not usually clinically relevant. They may become relevant if other problems are present, such as issues with drug excretion.

=== Based on metabolism ===
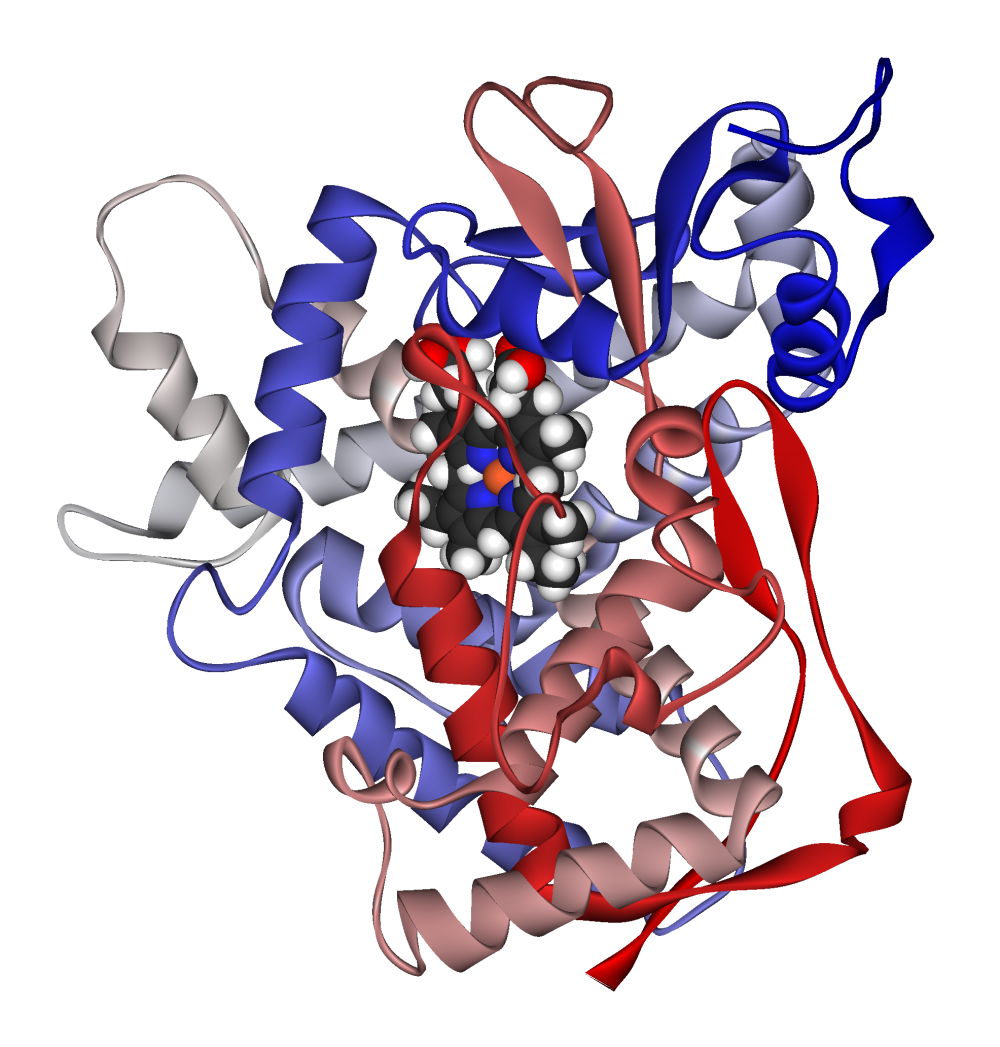
Diagram of cytochrome P450 isoenzyme 2C9 with the haem group in the centre of the enzyme.

Many drug interactions are due to alterations in drug metabolism. Further, human drug-metabolizing enzymes are typically activated through the engagement of nuclear receptors. One notable system involved in metabolic drug interactions is the enzyme system comprising the cytochrome P450 oxidases.

==== CYP450 ====
Cytochrome P450 is a very large family of haemoproteins (hemoproteins) that are characterized by their enzymatic activity and their role in the metabolism of a large number of drugs. Of the various families that are present in humans, the most interesting in this respect are the 1, 2 and 3, and the most important enzymes are CYP1A2, CYP2C9, CYP2C19, CYP2D6, CYP2E1 and CYP3A4. The majority of the enzymes are also involved in the metabolism of endogenous substances, such as steroids or sex hormones, which is also important should there be interference with these substances. The function of the enzymes can either be stimulated (enzyme induction) or inhibited (enzyme inhibition).

==== Through enzymatic inhibition and induction ====
If a drug is metabolized by a CYP450 enzyme and drug B blocks the activity of these enzymes, it can lead to pharmacokinetic alterations. A. This alteration results in drug A remaining in the bloodstream for an extended duration, and eventually increase in concentration.

In some instances, the inhibition may reduce the therapeutic effect, if instead the metabolites of the drug is responsible for the effect.

Compounds that increase the efficiency of the enzymes, on the other hand, may have the opposite effect and increase the rate of metabolism.

==== Oligonucleotide therapeutics ====
Unlike small-molecule drugs, approved RNAi-based therapeutics such as siRNA drugs do not significantly induce or inhibit cytochrome P450 (CYP) enzymes, and therefore require distinct frameworks for evaluating drug–drug interactions (DDIs).

Several interaction mechanisms relevant to oligonucleotide drugs have been identified:

- Transporter competition: Many GalNAc-conjugated siRNA drugs (e.g., inclisiran, givosiran, lumasiran) are taken up by hepatocytes via the asialoglycoprotein receptor (ASGPR). Co-administration of agents that saturate or alter this receptor pathway may affect hepatic delivery of the siRNA payload.
- Carrier protein binding: Some oligonucleotide drugs bind serum albumin or lipoproteins. Competition with highly protein-bound small molecules could alter free-drug concentrations.
- Indirect CYP modulation: siRNA drugs that silence transcription factors controlling CYP gene expression (e.g., silencing of PCSK9 influences LXR/SREBP pathways) may indirectly alter CYP expression in co-treated patients.
- On-target miRNA network perturbation: Because endogenous microRNA (miRNA) regulates the expression of drug-metabolizing enzymes and transporters, therapeutic oligonucleotides that modulate miRNA activity can produce secondary DDIs via altered enzyme expression rather than direct enzyme binding.

Regulatory guidance from the FDA recommends that sponsors of oligonucleotide drug applications assess DDI potential through in vitro transporter studies and, where indirect CYP modulation is plausible, through induction assays, even when direct CYP inhibition is absent.

==== Examples of metabolism-based interactions ====
An example of this is shown in the following table for the CYP1A2 enzyme, showing the substrates (drugs metabolized by this enzyme) and some inductors and inhibitors of its activity:

Drugs related to CYP1A2
Substrates	Inhibitors	Inductors
Caffeine; Theophylline; Phenacetin; Clomipramine; Clozapine; Thioridazine	Omeprazole; Nicotine; Cimetidine; Ciprofloxacin	Phenobarbital; Fluvoxamine; Venlafaxine; Ticlopidine

Some foods also act as inductors or inhibitors of enzymatic activity. The following table shows the most common:

Foods and their influence on drug metabolism
Food	Mechanism	Drugs affected
Avocado; Brassicas (Brussels sprouts, broccoli, cabbage)	Enzymatic inductor	Acenocoumarol, warfarin
Grapefruit juice	Enzymatic inhibition	Calcium channel blockers: nifedipine, felodipine, nimodipine, amlodipine; Cyclosporine, tacrolimus; Terfenadine, astemizole; Cisapride, pimozide; Carbamazepine, saquinavir, midazolam, alprazolam, triazolam; Main article: Grapefruit drug interactions
Soya	Enzymatic inhibition	Clozapine, haloperidol, olanzapine, caffeine, NSAIDs, phenytoin, zafirlukast, warfarin
Garlic	Increases antiplatelet activity	Anticoagulants; NSAIDs, acetylsalicylic acid
Ginseng	To be determined	Warfarin, heparin, aspirin and NSAIDs
Ginkgo biloba	Strong inhibitor of platelet aggregation factor	Warfarin, aspirin and NSAIDs
Hypericum perforatum (St John's wort)	Enzymatic inductor (CYP450)	Warfarin, digoxin, theophylline, cyclosporine, phenytoin and antiretrovirals
Ephedra	Receptor level agonist	MAOI, central nervous system stimulants, alkaloids ergotamines and xanthines
Kava (Piper methysticum)	Unknown	Levodopa
Ginger	Inhibits thromboxane synthetase (in vitro)	Anticoagulants
Chamomile	Unknown	Benzodiazepines, barbiturates and opioids
Hawthorn	Unknown	Beta-adrenergic antagonists, cisapride, digoxin, quinidine

=== Based on excretion ===
==== Renal and biliary excretion ====
Drugs tightly bound to proteins (i.e. not in the free fraction) are not available for renal excretion. Filtration depends on a number of factors including the pH of the urine. Drug interactions may affect those points.

== With herbal medicines ==
Herb-drug interactions are drug interactions that occur between herbal medicines and conventional drugs. These types of interactions may be more common than drug-drug interactions because herbal medicines often contain multiple pharmacologically active ingredients, while conventional drugs typically contain only one. Some such interactions are clinically significant, although most herbal remedies are not associated with drug interactions causing serious consequences. Most catalogued herb-drug interactions are moderate in severity. The most commonly implicated conventional drugs in herb-drug interactions are warfarin, insulin, aspirin, digoxin, and ticlopidine, due to their narrow therapeutic indices. The most commonly implicated herbs involved in such interactions are those containing St. John's Wort, magnesium, calcium, iron, or ginkgo.

=== Examples ===
Examples of herb-drug interactions include, but are not limited to:

- St. John's wort affects the clearance of numerous drugs, including cyclosporin, SSRI antidepressants, digoxin, indinavir, and phenprocoumon. It may also interact with the anti-cancer drugs irinotecan and imatinib.
- Salvia miltiorrhiza may enhance anticoagulation and bleeding among people taking warfarin.
- Allium sativum has been found to decrease the plasma concentration of saquinavir, and may cause hypoglycemia when taken with chlorpropamide.
- Ginkgo biloba can cause bleeding when combined with warfarin or aspirin.
- Concomitant Ephedra and caffeine use has been reported to, in rare cases, cause fatalities.

=== Mechanisms ===
The mechanisms underlying most herb-drug interactions are not fully understood. Interactions between herbal medicines and anticancer drugs typically involve enzymes that metabolize cytochrome P450. For example, St. John's Wort has been shown to induce CYP3A4 and P-glycoprotein in vitro and in vivo.

== Underlying factors ==
The factors or conditions that predispose the appearance of interactions include factors such as old age. This is where human physiology changing with age may affect the interaction of drugs. For example, liver metabolism, kidney function, nerve transmission, or the functioning of bone marrow all decrease with age. In addition, in old age, there is a sensory decrease that increases the chances of errors being made in the administration of drugs. The elderly are also more vulnerable to polypharmacy, and the more drugs a patient takes, the higher is the chance of an interaction.

Genetic factors may also affect the enzymes and receptors, thus altering the possibilities of interactions.

Patients with hepatic or renal diseases already may have difficulties metabolizing and excreting drugs, which may exacerbate the effect of interactions.

Some drugs present an intrinsic increased risk for a harmful interaction, including drugs with a narrow therapeutic index, where the difference between the effective dose and the toxic dose is small. (Note: The term effective dose is generally understood to mean the minimum amount of a drug that is needed to produce the required effect. The toxic dose is the minimum amount of a drug that will produce a damaging effect.) The drug digoxin is an example of this type of drug.

Risks are also increased when the drug presents a steep dose-response curve, and small changes in the dosage produce large changes in the drug's concentration in the blood plasma.

== Epidemiology ==
As of 2008, among adults in the United States of America older than 56, 4% were taking medication and/ or supplements that put them at risk of a major drug interaction. Potential drug-drug interactions have increased over time and are more common in the less-educated elderly even after controlling for age, sex, place of residence, and comorbidity.

== See also ==
- Deprescribing
- Cytochrome P450
- Classification of Pharmaco-Therapeutic Referrals

== Bibliography ==
- MA Cos. Interacciones de fármacos y sus implicancias clínicas. In: Farmacología Humana. Chap. 10, pp. 165–176. (J. Flórez y col. Eds). Masson SA, Barcelona. 1997.
