= RNA interference =

Biological process of gene regulation

Lentiviral delivery of designed shRNAs and the mechanism of RNA interference in mammalian cells

RNA interference (RNAi) is a biological process in which RNA molecules are involved in sequence-specific suppression of gene expression by double-stranded RNA, through translational or transcriptional repression. Historically, RNAi was known by other names, including co-suppression, post-transcriptional gene silencing (PTGS), and quelling. The detailed study of each of these seemingly different processes elucidated that the identity of these phenomena were all actually RNAi. Andrew Fire and Craig Mello shared the 2006 Nobel Prize in Physiology or Medicine for their work on RNAi in the nematode worm Caenorhabditis elegans, which they published in 1998. Since the discovery of RNAi and its regulatory potentials, it has become evident that RNAi has immense potential in suppression of desired genes. RNAi is now known as precise, efficient, stable and better than antisense therapy for gene suppression. Antisense RNA produced intracellularly by an expression vector may be developed and find utility as novel therapeutic agents.

Two types of small ribonucleic acid (RNA) molecules, microRNA (miRNA) and small interfering RNA (siRNA), are central to components to the RNAi pathway. Once mRNA is degraded, post-transcriptional silencing occurs as protein translation is prevented. Transcription can be inhibited via the pre-transcriptional silencing mechanism of RNAi, through which an enzyme complex catalyzes DNA methylation at genomic positions complementary to complexed siRNA or miRNA. RNAi has an important role in defending cells against parasitic nucleotide sequences (e.g., viruses or transposons) and also influences development of organisms.

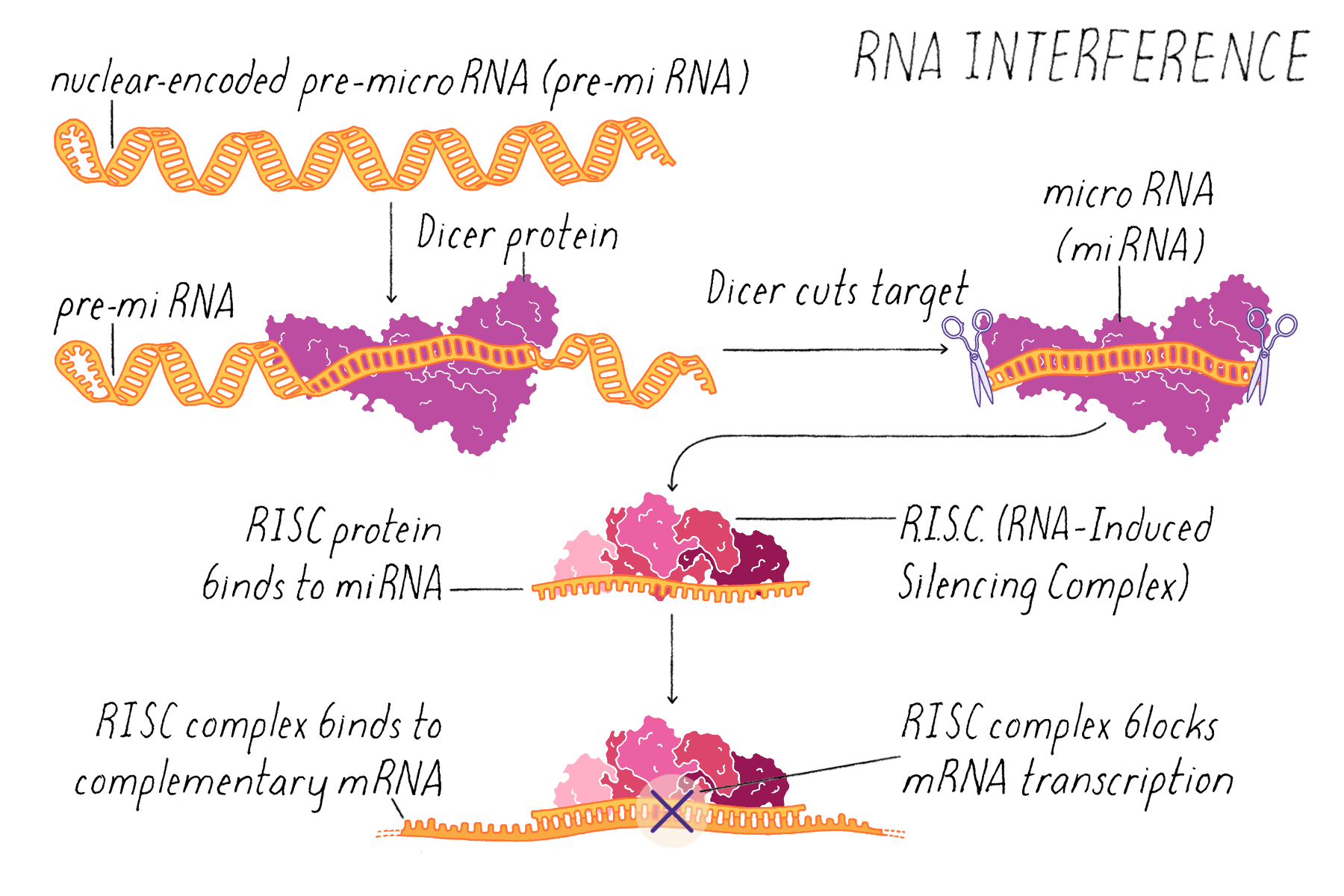
A biological process in which RNA molecules neutralize targeted mRNA molecules to silence, or deactivate, genes.

The RNAi pathway is a naturally occurring process found in many eukaryotes. It is initiated by the enzyme Dicer, which cleaves long double-stranded RNA (dsRNA) molecules into short double-stranded fragments of approximately 21 to 23 nucleotide siRNAs. Each siRNA is unwound into two single-stranded RNAs (ssRNAs), the passenger (sense) strand and the guide (antisense) strand. The passenger strand is then cleaved by the protein Argonaute 2 (Ago2). The passenger strand is degraded and the guide strand is incorporated into the RNA-induced silencing complex (RISC). The RISC assembly then binds and degrades the target mRNA. Specifically, this is accomplished when the guide strand pairs with a complementary sequence in a mRNA molecule and induces cleavage by Ago2, a catalytic component of the RISC. In some organisms, this process spreads systemically, despite the initially limited molar concentrations of siRNA.

RNAi is a valuable research tool, both in cell culture and in living organisms, because synthetic dsRNA introduced into cells can selectively and robustly induce suppression of specific genes of interest. RNAi may be used for large-scale screens that systematically shut down each gene (and the subsequent proteins it codes for) in the cell, which can help to identify the components necessary for a particular cellular process or an event such as cell division. The pathway is also used as a practical tool for food, medicine and insecticides.

== Cellular mechanism ==
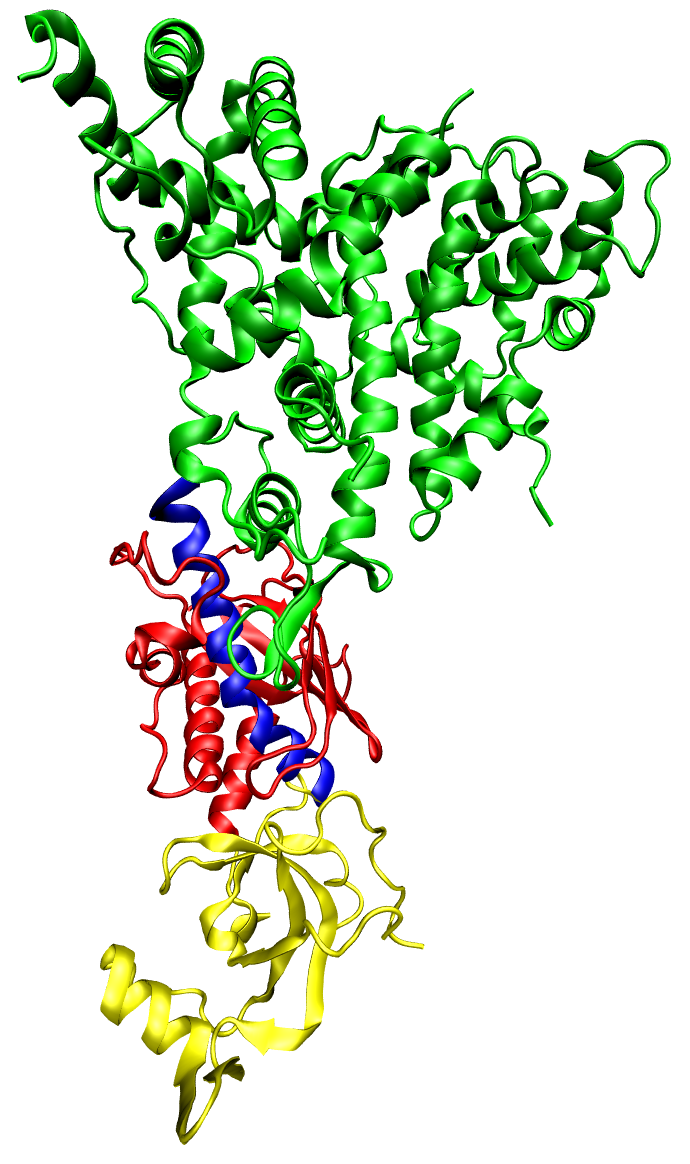
The Dicer protein from Giardia, which catalyzes the cleavage of dsRNA to siRNAs. The RNase domains are colored green, the PAZ domain yellow, the platform domain red, and the connector helix blue.

RNAi is an RNA-dependent gene silencing process that is controlled by RISC and is initiated by short double-stranded RNA molecules in a cell's cytoplasm, where they interact with the catalytic RISC component Argonaute. When the dsRNA is exogenous (coming from infection by a virus with an RNA genome or laboratory manipulations), the RNA is imported directly into the cytoplasm and cleaved to short fragments by Dicer. The initiating dsRNA can also be endogenous (originating in the cell), as in pre-microRNAs expressed from RNA-coding genes in the genome. The primary transcripts from such genes are first processed to form the characteristic stem-loop structure of pre-miRNA in the nucleus, then exported to the cytoplasm. Thus, the two dsRNA pathways, exogenous and endogenous, converge at the RISC.

Exogenous dsRNA initiates RNAi by activating the ribonuclease protein Dicer, which binds and cleaves dsRNAs in plants, or short hairpin RNAs (shRNAs) in humans, to produce double-stranded fragments of 20–25 base pairs with a 2-nucleotide overhang at the 3′ end. Bioinformatics studies on the genomes of multiple organisms suggest this length maximizes target-gene specificity and minimizes non-specific effects. These short double-stranded fragments are called siRNAs. These siRNAs are then separated into single strands and integrated into an active RISC, by RISC-Loading Complex (RLC). RLC includes Dicer-2 and R2D2, and is crucial to unite Ago2 and RISC. TATA-binding protein-associated factor 11 (TAF11) assembles the RLC by facilitating Dcr-2-R2D2 tetramerization, which increases the binding affinity to siRNA by 10-fold. Association with TAF11 would convert the R2-D2-Initiator (RDI) complex into the RLC. R2D2 carries tandem double-stranded RNA-binding domains to recognize the thermodynamically stable terminus of siRNA duplexes, whereas Dicer-2 the other less stable extremity. Loading is asymmetric: the MID domain of Ago2 recognizes the thermodynamically stable end of the siRNA. Therefore, the "passenger" (sense) strand whose 5′ end is discarded by MID is ejected, while the saved "guide" (antisense) strand cooperates with AGO to form the RISC.

After integration into the RISC, siRNAs base-pair to their target mRNA and cleave it, thereby preventing it from being used as a translation template. Differently from siRNA, a miRNA-loaded RISC complex scans cytoplasmic mRNAs for potential complementarity. Instead of destructive cleavage (by Ago2), miRNAs rather target the 3′ untranslated region (UTR) regions of mRNAs where they typically bind with imperfect complementarity, thus blocking the access of ribosomes for translation.

Exogenous dsRNA is detected and bound by an effector protein, known as RDE-4 in C. elegans and R2D2 in Drosophila, that stimulates Dicer activity. The mechanism producing this length specificity is unknown and this protein only binds long dsRNAs.

In C. elegans this initiation response is amplified through the synthesis of a population of 'secondary' siRNAs during which the Dicer-produced initiating or 'primary' siRNAs are used as templates. These 'secondary' siRNAs are structurally distinct from Dicer-produced siRNAs and appear to be produced by an RNA-dependent RNA polymerase (RdRP).

=== MicroRNA ===
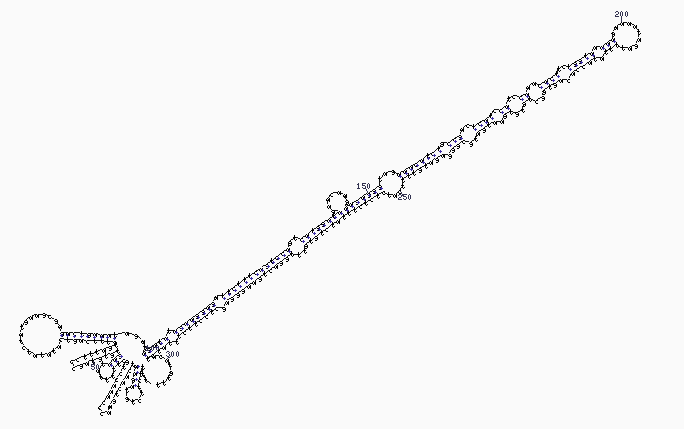
The stem-loop secondary structure of a pre-microRNA from Brassica oleracea

MicroRNAs (miRNAs) are genomically encoded non-coding RNAs that help regulate gene expression, particularly during development. The phenomenon of RNAi, broadly defined, includes the endogenously induced gene silencing effects of miRNAs as well as silencing triggered by foreign dsRNA. Mature miRNAs are structurally similar to siRNAs produced from exogenous dsRNA, but before reaching maturity, miRNAs must first undergo extensive post-transcriptional modification. A miRNA is expressed from a much longer RNA-coding gene as a primary transcript known as a pri-miRNA which is processed, in the cell nucleus, to a 70-nucleotide stem-loop structure called a pre-miRNA by the microprocessor complex. This complex consists of an RNase III enzyme called Drosha and a dsRNA-binding protein DGCR8. The dsRNA portion of this pre-miRNA is bound and cleaved by Dicer to produce the mature miRNA molecule that can be integrated into the RISC complex; thus, miRNA and siRNA share the same downstream cellular machinery. First, viral encoded miRNA was described in Epstein–Barr virus (EBV). Thereafter, an increasing number of microRNAs have been described in viruses. VIRmiRNA is a comprehensive catalogue covering viral microRNA, their targets and anti-viral miRNAs (see also VIRmiRNA resource: http://crdd.osdd.net/servers/virmirna/).

siRNAs derived from long dsRNA precursors differ from miRNAs in that miRNAs, especially those in animals, typically have incomplete base pairing to a target and inhibit the translation of many different mRNAs with similar sequences. In contrast, siRNAs typically base-pair perfectly and induce mRNA cleavage only in a single, specific target. In Drosophila and C. elegans, miRNA and siRNA are processed by distinct Argonaute proteins and Dicer enzymes.

=== Three prime untranslated regions and microRNAs ===
Three prime untranslated regions (3′UTRs) of mRNAs often contain regulatory sequences that post-transcriptionally cause RNAi. Such 3′-UTRs often contain both binding sites for miRNAs as well as for regulatory proteins. By binding to specific sites within the 3′-UTR, miRNAs can decrease gene expression of various mRNAs by either inhibiting translation or directly causing degradation of the transcript. The 3′-UTR also may have silencer regions that bind repressor proteins that inhibit the expression of a mRNA.

The 3′-UTR often contains microRNA response elements (MREs). MREs are sequences to which miRNAs bind, primarily through evolutionarily conserved seed sequences six to eight nucleobases in length. These are prevalent motifs within 3′-UTRs. Among all regulatory motifs within the 3′-UTRs (e.g. including silencer regions), MREs make up about half of the motifs.

As of 2023, the miRBase web site, an archive of miRNA sequences and annotations, listed 28,645 entries in 271 biologic species. Of these, 1,917 miRNAs were in annotated human miRNA loci. miRNAs were predicted to have an average of about four hundred target mRNAs (affecting expression of several hundred genes). Friedman et al. estimate that >45,000 miRNA target sites within human mRNA 3′UTRs are conserved above background levels, and >60% of human protein-coding genes have been under selective pressure to maintain pairing to miRNAs.

Direct experiments show that a single miRNA can reduce the stability of hundreds of unique mRNAs. Other experiments show that a single miRNA may repress the production of hundreds of proteins, but that this repression often is relatively mild (less than 2-fold).

The effects of miRNA dysregulation of gene expression seem to be important in cancer. For instance, in gastrointestinal cancers, nine miRNAs have been identified as epigenetically altered and effective in down regulating DNA repair enzymes.

The let-7 family of miRNAs provides a well-characterized example of miRNA dysregulation in cancer. Let-7-5p isoforms are among the most consistently downregulated miRNAs in hepatocellular carcinoma and several other malignancies, and their suppression is associated with upregulation of oncogenes including c-MYC, CDK6, and the RNA-binding protein LIN28B, as well as efflux ATP-binding cassette (ABC) transporters that govern multidrug resistance.

Loss of let-7 activity establishes a self-reinforcing circuit, as LIN28B actively suppresses let-7 maturation, further sustaining the expression of let-7 target genes and contributing to a chemotherapy-resistant phenotype. Reintroduction of depleted tumor-suppressive miRNAs has therefore been explored as a strategy to restore natural post-transcriptional regulation of oncogenic targets and resensitize resistant cancer cells to treatment. Because the let-7 family comprises multiple isoforms that share a conserved seed sequence but differ outside it, the choice of isoform influences which targets are most effectively regulated and to what degree, underscoring that even closely related miRNA family members are not functionally interchangeable.

The effects of miRNA dysregulation of gene expression also seem to be important in neuropsychiatric disorders, such as schizophrenia, bipolar disorder, major depression, Parkinson's disease, Alzheimer's disease and autism spectrum disorders.

==== Bioengineered RNA agents to study miRNA function and replacement therapy ====
A longstanding limitation in miRNA research has been the reliance on chemically synthesized miRNA mimics or biosimilars, which bear extensive non-natural chemical modifications—including altered ribose subunits and backbone linkages—whose physiochemical and biological properties may not faithfully recapitulate those of endogenous, genome-derived miRNA species.

While chemical modifications may improve metabolic stability and binding affinity, their inclusion introduces structural divergence from natural miRNA and may increase immunogenic risk, raising questions about how accurately commercial mimics model endogenous miRNA biology.

To address these concerns, RNA molecular bioengineering platforms have been developed that produce recombinant miRNA molecules—termed bioengineered RNAs (BioRNAs)—through in vivo fermentation in bacteria using human transfer RNA (htRNA) fused precursor miRNA carriers. This approach yields agents with high purity, low endotoxin content, and structural and chemical properties that more closely represent those of naturally processed, endogenous miRNA, including post-transcriptional modifications acquired during biogenesis in living cells. BioRNA agents have been produced successfully across a diverse panel of miRNA sequences and have demonstrated functional equivalence to or improvement over commercial LNA mimics in regulating target gene expression—including known cancer-relevant targets such as EGFR, MRP1, and VDAC1—in human cancer cell lines.

Beyond their utility as research tools, BioRNA agents have been applied to miRNA replacement therapy, a strategy that seeks to reintroduce tumor-suppressive miRNAs depleted in disease tissue to harness endogenous RNAi machinery for treatment. In preclinical cancer models, bioengineered miRNA agents have demonstrated antitumor activity, the ability to suppress multidrug resistance by downregulating efflux transporter expression, and pharmacological synergism with co-administered chemotherapeutic drugs—providing a mechanistic rationale for their development as combination therapeutics.

=== RISC activation and catalysis ===
Exogenous dsRNA is detected and bound by an effector protein, known as RDE-4 in C. elegans and R2D2 in Drosophila, that stimulates Dicer activity. This protein only binds long dsRNAs, but the mechanism producing this length specificity is unknown. This RNA-binding protein then facilitates the transfer of cleaved siRNAs to the RISC complex.

In C. elegans this initiation response is amplified through the synthesis of a population of 'secondary' siRNAs during which the Dicer-produced initiating or 'primary' siRNAs are used as templates. These 'secondary' siRNAs are structurally distinct from Dicer-produced siRNAs and appear to be produced by an RNA-dependent RNA polymerase (RdRP).

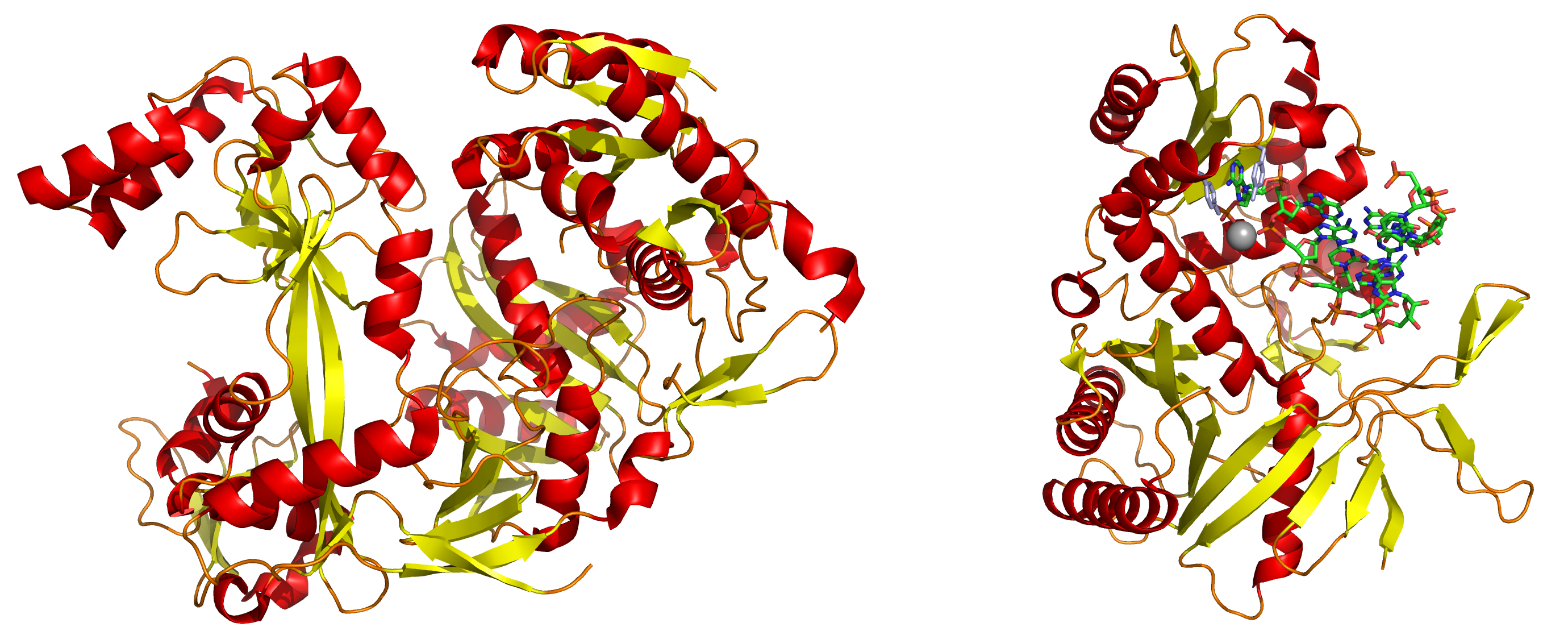
Left: A full-length Argonaute protein from the archaea species Pyrococcus furiosus. Right: The PIWI domain of an Argonaute protein in complex with double-stranded RNA.

The active components of an RNA-induced silencing complex (RISC) are endonucleases called Argonaute proteins, which cleave the target mRNA strand complementary to their bound siRNA. As the fragments produced by Dicer are double-stranded, they could each in theory produce a functional siRNA. However, only one of the two strands, which is known as the guide strand, binds Argonaute and directs gene silencing. The other anti-guide strand or passenger strand is degraded during RISC activation. Although it was first believed that an ATP-dependent helicase separated these two strands, the process proved to be ATP-independent and performed directly by the protein components of RISC. However, an in vitro kinetic analysis of RNAi in the presence and absence of ATP showed that ATP may be required to unwind and remove the cleaved mRNA strand from the RISC complex after catalysis. The guide strand tends to be the one whose 5′ end is less stably paired to its complement, but strand selection is unaffected by the direction in which Dicer cleaves the dsRNA before RISC incorporation. Instead, the R2D2 protein may serve as the differentiating factor by binding the more-stable 5′ end of the passenger strand.

The structural basis for binding of RNA to the Argonaute protein was examined by X-ray crystallography of the binding domain of an RNA-bound Argonaute. Here, the phosphorylated 5′ end of the RNA strand enters a conserved basic surface pocket and makes contacts through a divalent cation (an atom with two positive charges) such as magnesium and by aromatic stacking (a process that allows more than one atom to share an electron by passing it back and forth) between the 5′ nucleotide in the siRNA and a conserved tyrosine residue. This site is thought to form a nucleation site for the binding of the siRNA to its mRNA target. Analysis of the inhibitory effect of mismatches in either the 5' or 3' end of the guide strand has demonstrated that the 5' end of the guide strand is likely responsible for matching and binding the target mRNA, while the 3' end is responsible for physically arranging target mRNA into a cleavage-favorable RISC region.

It is not understood how the activated RISC complex locates complementary mRNAs within the cell. Although the cleavage process has been proposed to be linked to translation, translation of the mRNA target is not essential for RNAi-mediated degradation. Indeed, RNAi may be more effective against mRNA targets that are not translated. Argonaute proteins are localized to specific regions in the cytoplasm called P-bodies (also cytoplasmic bodies or GW bodies), which are regions with high rates of mRNA decay; miRNA activity is also clustered in P-bodies. Disruption of P-bodies decreases the efficiency of RNAi, suggesting that they are a critical site in the RNAi process.

=== Transcriptional silencing ===
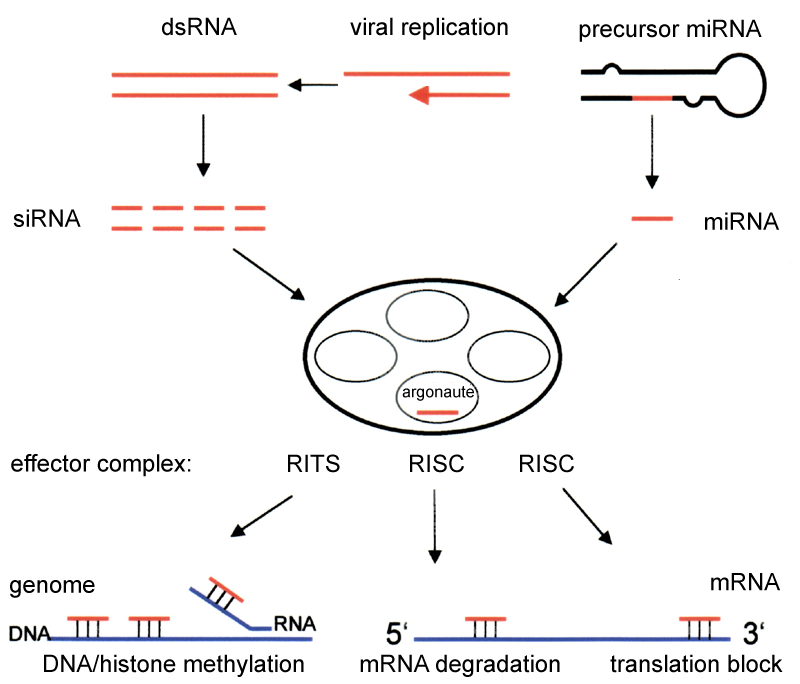
The enzyme Dicer trims double stranded RNA, to form small interfering RNA or microRNA. These processed RNAs are incorporated into the RNA-induced silencing complex (RISC), which targets messenger RNA to prevent translation.

Components of the RNAi pathway are used in many eukaryotes in the maintenance of the organization and structure of their genomes. Modification of histones and associated induction of heterochromatin formation serves to downregulate genes pre-transcriptionally; this process is referred to as RNA-induced transcriptional silencing (RITS), and is carried out by a complex of proteins called the RITS complex. In fission yeast this complex contains Argonaute, a chromodomain protein Chp1, and a protein called Tas3 of unknown function. As a consequence, the induction and spread of heterochromatic regions requires the Argonaute and RdRP proteins. Indeed, deletion of these genes in the fission yeast S. pombe disrupts histone methylation and centromere formation, causing slow or stalled anaphase during cell division. In some cases, similar processes associated with histone modification have been observed to transcriptionally upregulate genes.

The mechanism by which the RITS complex induces heterochromatin formation and organization is not well understood. Most studies have focused on the mating-type region in fission yeast, which may not be representative of activities in other genomic regions/organisms. In maintenance of existing heterochromatin regions, RITS forms a complex with siRNAs complementary to the local genes and stably binds local methylated histones, acting co-transcriptionally to degrade any nascent pre-mRNA transcripts that are initiated by RNA polymerase. The formation of such a heterochromatin region, though not its maintenance, is Dicer-dependent, presumably because Dicer is required to generate the initial complement of siRNAs that target subsequent transcripts. Heterochromatin maintenance has been suggested to function as a self-reinforcing feedback loop, as new siRNAs are formed from the occasional nascent transcripts by RdRP for incorporation into local RITS complexes. The relevance of observations from fission yeast mating-type regions and centromeres to mammals is not clear, as heterochromatin maintenance in mammalian cells may be independent of the components of the RNAi pathway.

=== Crosstalk with RNA editing ===
The type of RNA editing that is most prevalent in higher eukaryotes converts adenosine nucleotides into inosine in dsRNAs via the enzyme adenosine deaminase (ADAR). It was originally proposed in 2000 that the RNAi and A→I RNA editing pathways might compete for a common dsRNA substrate. Some pre-miRNAs do undergo A→I RNA editing and this mechanism may regulate the processing and expression of mature miRNAs. Furthermore, at least one mammalian ADAR can sequester siRNAs from RNAi pathway components. Further support for this model comes from studies on ADAR-null C. elegans strains indicating that A→I RNA editing may counteract RNAi silencing of endogenous genes and transgenes.

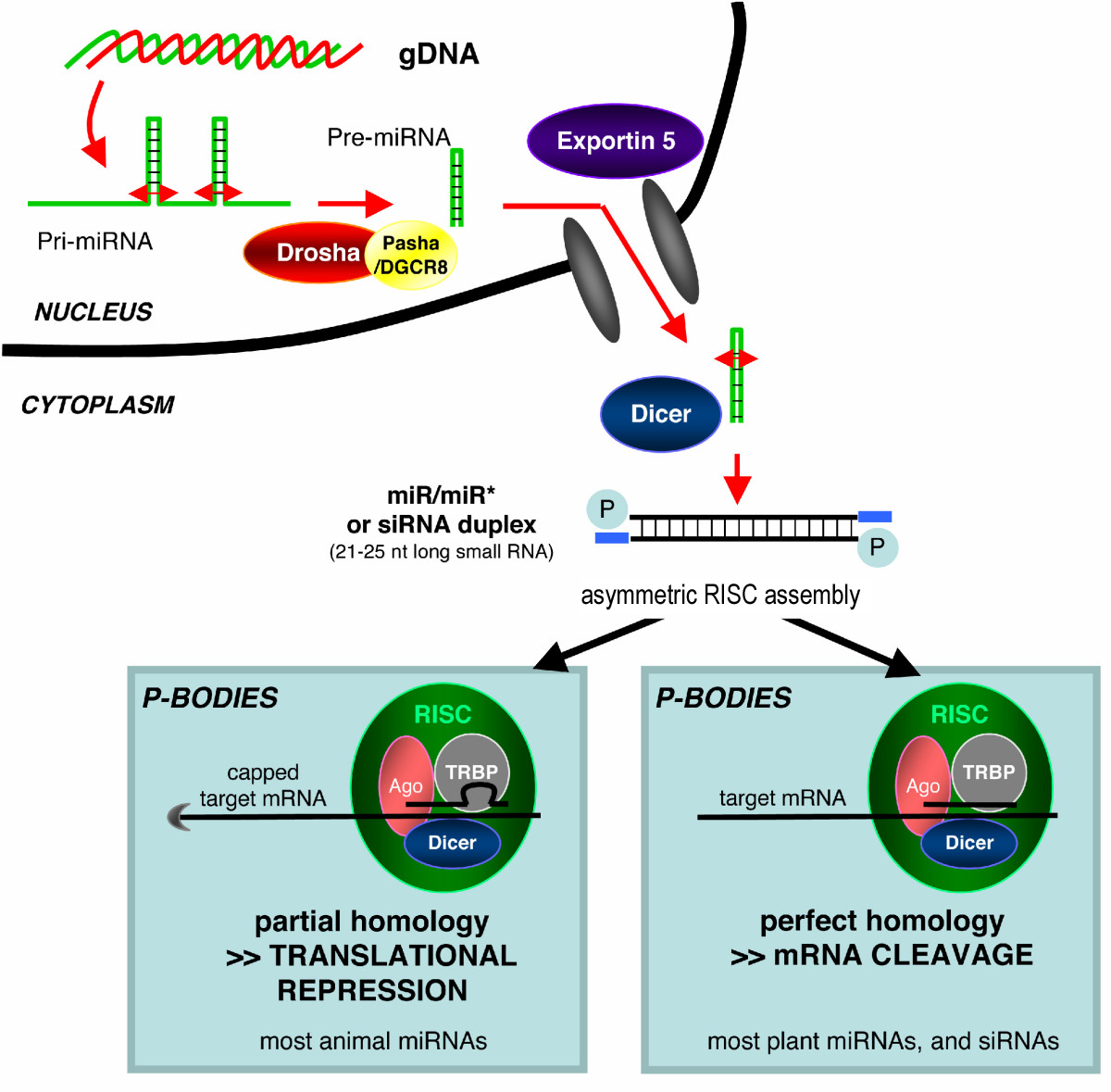
Illustration of the major differences between plant and animal gene silencing. Natively expressed microRNA or exogenous siRNA is processed by Dicer and integrated into the RISC complex, which mediates gene silencing.

=== Variation among organisms ===
Organisms vary in their ability to take up foreign dsRNA and use it in the RNAi pathway. The effects of RNAi can be both systemic and heritable in plants and C. elegans, although not in Drosophila or mammals. In plants, RNAi is thought to propagate by the transfer of siRNAs between cells through plasmodesmata (channels in the cell walls that enable communication and transport). Heritability comes from methylation of promoters targeted by RNAi; the new methylation pattern is copied in each new generation of the cell. A broad general distinction between plants and animals lies in the targeting of endogenously produced miRNAs; in plants, miRNAs are usually perfectly or nearly perfectly complementary to their target genes and induce direct mRNA cleavage by RISC, while animals' miRNAs tend to be more divergent in sequence and induce translational repression. This translational effect may be produced by inhibiting the interactions of translation initiation factors with the mRNA's polyadenine tail.

Some eukaryotic protozoa such as Leishmania major and Trypanosoma cruzi lack the RNAi pathway entirely. Most or all of the components are also missing in some fungi, most notably the model organism Saccharomyces cerevisiae. The presence of RNAi in other budding yeast species such as Saccharomyces castellii and Candida albicans, further demonstrates that inducing two RNAi-related proteins from S. castellii facilitates RNAi in S. cerevisiae. That certain ascomycetes and basidiomycetes are missing RNAi pathways indicates that proteins required for RNA silencing have been lost independently from many fungal lineages, possibly due to the evolution of a novel pathway with similar function, or to the lack of selective advantage in certain niches.

=== Related prokaryotic systems ===
Gene expression in prokaryotes is influenced by an RNA-based system similar in some respects to RNAi. Here, RNA-encoding genes control mRNA abundance or translation by producing a complementary RNA that anneals to an mRNA. However these regulatory RNAs are not generally considered to be analogous to miRNAs because the Dicer enzyme is not involved. It has been suggested that CRISPR interference systems in prokaryotes are analogous to eukaryotic RNAi systems, although none of the protein components are orthologous.

== Biological functions ==
=== Immunity ===
RNAi is a vital part of the immune response to viruses and other foreign genetic material, especially in plants where it may also prevent the self-propagation of transposons. Plants such as Arabidopsis thaliana express multiple Dicer homologs that are specialized to react differently when the plant is exposed to different viruses. Even before the RNAi pathway was fully understood, it was known that induced gene silencing in plants could spread throughout the plant in a systemic effect and could be transferred from stock to scion plants via grafting. This phenomenon has since been recognized as a feature of the plant immune system which allows the entire plant to respond to a virus after an initial localized encounter. In response, many plant viruses have evolved elaborate mechanisms to suppress the RNAi response. These include viral proteins that bind short double-stranded RNA fragments with single-stranded overhang ends, such as those produced by Dicer. Some plant genomes also express endogenous siRNAs in response to infection by specific types of bacteria. These effects may be part of a generalized response to pathogens that downregulates any metabolic process in the host that aids the infection process.

Although animals generally express fewer variants of the Dicer enzyme than plants, RNAi in some animals produces an antiviral response. In both juvenile and adult Drosophila, RNAi is important in antiviral innate immunity and is active against pathogens such as Drosophila X virus. A similar role in immunity may operate in C. elegans, as Argonaute proteins are upregulated in response to viruses and worms that overexpress components of the RNAi pathway are resistant to viral infection.

The role of RNAi in mammalian innate immunity is poorly understood, and relatively little data is available. However, the existence of viruses that encode genes able to suppress the RNAi response in mammalian cells may be evidence in favour of an RNAi-dependent mammalian immune response, although this hypothesis has been challenged as poorly substantiated. Evidence for the existence of a functional antiviral RNAi pathway in mammalian cells has been presented.

Other functions for RNAi in mammalian viruses also exist, such as miRNAs expressed by the herpes virus that may act as heterochromatin organization triggers to mediate viral latency.

=== Downregulation of genes ===
Endogenously expressed miRNAs, including both intronic and intergenic miRNAs, are most important in translational repression and in the regulation of development, especially on the timing of morphogenesis and the maintenance of undifferentiated or incompletely differentiated cell types such as stem cells. The role of endogenously expressed miRNA in downregulating gene expression was first described in C. elegans in 1993. In plants this function was discovered when the "JAW microRNA" of Arabidopsis was shown to be involved in the regulation of several genes that control plant shape. In plants, the majority of genes regulated by miRNAs are transcription factors; thus miRNA activity is particularly wide-ranging and regulates entire gene networks during development by modulating the expression of key regulatory genes, including transcription factors as well as F-box proteins. In many organisms, including humans, miRNAs are linked to the formation of tumors and dysregulation of the cell cycle. Here, miRNAs can function as both oncogenes and tumor suppressors.

== Evolution ==
Based on parsimony-based phylogenetic analysis, the most recent common ancestor of all eukaryotes most likely already possessed an early RNAi pathway; the absence of the pathway in certain eukaryotes is thought to be a derived characteristic. This ancestral RNAi system probably contained at least one Dicer-like protein, one Argonaute, one PIWI protein, and an RNA-dependent RNA polymerase that may also have played other cellular roles. A large-scale comparative genomics study likewise indicates that the eukaryotic crown group already possessed these components, which may then have had closer functional associations with generalized RNA degradation systems such as the exosome. This study also suggests that the RNA-binding Argonaute protein family, which is shared among eukaryotes, most archaea, and at least some bacteria (such as Aquifex aeolicus), is homologous to and originally evolved from components of the translation initiation system.

== Applications ==
=== RNAi pathway for gene knockdown ===
Gene knockdown is a method used to reduce the expression of an organism's specific genes. This is accomplished by using the naturally occurring process of RNAi. This gene knockdown technique uses a double-stranded siRNA molecule that is synthesized with a sequence complementary to the gene of interest. The RNAi cascade begins once the Dicer enzyme starts to process siRNA. The end result of the process leads to degradation of mRNA and destroys any instructions needed to build certain proteins. Using this method, researchers are able to decrease (but not completely eliminate) the expression of a targeted gene. Studying the effects of this decrease in expression may show the physiological role or impact of the targeted gene products.

==== Off-Target Effects of Gene Knockdown ====
Extensive efforts in computational biology have been directed toward the design of successful dsRNA reagents that maximize gene knockdown but minimize "off-target" effects. Off-target effects arise when an introduced RNA has a base sequence that can pair with and thus reduce the expression of multiple genes. Such problems occur more frequently when the dsRNA contains repetitive sequences. It has been estimated from studying the genomes of humans, C. elegans and S. pombe that about 10% of possible siRNAs have substantial off-target effects. A multitude of software tools have been developed implementing algorithms for the design of general mammal-specific, and virus-specific siRNAs that are automatically checked for possible cross-reactivity.

Depending on the organism and experimental system, the exogenous RNA may be a long strand designed to be cleaved by Dicer, or short RNAs designed to serve as siRNA substrates. In most mammalian cells, shorter RNAs are used because long double-stranded RNA molecules induce the mammalian interferon response, a form of innate immunity that reacts nonspecifically to foreign genetic material. Mouse oocytes and cells from early mouse embryos lack this reaction to exogenous dsRNA and are therefore a common model system for studying mammalian gene-knockdown effects. Specialized laboratory techniques have also been developed to improve the utility of RNAi in mammalian systems by avoiding the direct introduction of siRNA, for example, by stable transfection with a plasmid encoding the appropriate sequence from which siRNAs can be transcribed, or by more elaborate lentiviral vector systems allowing the inducible activation or deactivation of transcription, known as conditional RNAi.

=== Medicine ===
==== Medications ====
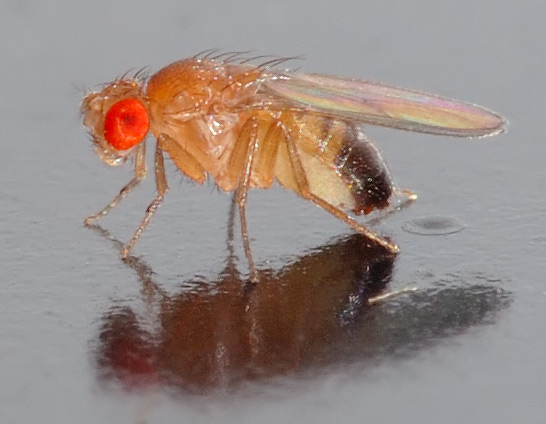
A normal adult Drosophila fly, a common model organism used in RNAi experiments

Timeline of the use of RNAi in medicine between 1996 and 2017

The technique of knocking down genes using RNAi therapeutics has demonstrated success in randomized controlled clinical studies. These medications are a growing class of siRNA-based drugs that decrease the expression of proteins encoded by certain genes. To date, five RNAi medications have been approved by regulatory authorities in the US and Europe: patisiran (2018), givosiran (2019), lumasiran (2020), inclisiran (2020 in Europe with anticipated US approval in 2021), and vutrisiran (2022).

While all of the current regulatory body approved RNAi therapeutics focus on diseases that originate in the liver, additional medications under investigation target a host of disease areas including cardiovascular diseases, bleeding disorders, alcohol use disorders, cystic fibrosis, gout, carcinoma, and eye disorders.

Patisiran is the first double stranded siRNA-based medication approved in 2018 and developed by Alnylam Pharmaceuticals. Patisiran uses the RNAi cascade to suppress the gene that codes for TTR (transthryetin). Mutations in this gene may cause the misfolding of a protein responsible for hereditary ATTR amyloidosis. To achieve therapeutic response, patisiran is encased by a lipid nanoparticle membrane that facilitates crossover into the cytoplasm. Once inside the cell, the siRNA begins processing by the enzyme Dicer. Patisiran is administered by a healthcare professional through an intravenous infusion with dosing based on body weight. Warnings and precautions include risk of infusion-related reactions and reduced vitamin A levels (serum).

In 2019, the FDA and EMA approved givosiran for the treatment of adults with acute hepatic porphyria (AHP). The FDA also granted givosiran a breakthrough therapy designation, priority review designation, and orphan drug designation for the treatment of acute hepatic porphyria (AHP) in November 2019. By 2020, givosiran received EMA approval. Givosiran is an siRNA that breaks down aminolevulinic acid synthase 1 (ALAS1) mRNA in the liver. Breaking down ALAS1 mRNA prevents toxins (responsible for neurovisceral attacks and AHP disease) such as aminolevulinic acid (ALA) and porphobilinogen (PBG) from accumulating. To facilitate entry into the cytoplasm, givosiran uses GalNAc ligands and enters into liver cells. The medication is administered subcutaneously by a healthcare professional with dosing based on body weight. Warnings and precautions include risk of anaphylactic reactions, hepatic toxicity, renal toxicity and injection site reactions.

Lumasiran was approved as a siRNA-based medication in 2020 for use in both the European Union and the United States. This medication is used for the treatment of primary hyperoxaluria type 1 (PH1) in pediatric and adult populations. The drug is designed to reduce hepatic oxalate production and urinary oxalate levels through RNAi by targeting hydroxyacid oxidase 1 (HAO1) mRNA for breakdown. Lowering HAO1 enzyme levels reduces the oxidation of glycolate to glyoxylate (which is a substrate for oxalate). Lumasiran is administered subcutaneously by a healthcare professional with dosing based on body weight. Data from randomized controlled clinical trials indicate that the most common adverse reaction that was reported was injection site reactions. These reactions were mild and were present in 38 percent of patients treated with lumasiran.

In 2022, the FDA and EMA approved vutrisiran for the treatment of adults with hereditary transthyretin mediated amyloidosis with polyneuropathy stage 1 or 2. Vutrisiran is designed to break down the mRNA that codes for transthyretin.

Currently FDA-approved RNAi therapies are summarized below, along with their indicationsm, delivery strategies, and routes of administration.

FDA-approved siRNA therapeutics (selected)
Drug	Brand name	Target gene	Indication	Delivery system
Patisiran	Onpattro	TTR	hATTR amyloidosis	LNP (IV)
Givosiran	Givlaari	ALAS1	Acute hepatic porphyria	GalNAc (SC)
Lumasiran	Oxlumo	HAO1	Primary hyperoxaluria type 1	GalNAc (SC)
Inclisiran	Leqvio	PCSK9	Hypercholesterolaemia	GalNAc (SC)
Vutrisiran	Amvuttra	TTR	hATTR amyloidosis	GalNAc (SC)
Fitusiran	Alhemo	SERPINC1 (antithrombin)	Haemophilia A/B	GalNAc (SC)
Nedosiran	Rivfloza	LDHA	Primary hyperoxaluria type 2/3	GalNAc (SC)

Other investigational drugs using RNAi that are being developed by pharmaceutical companies such as Arrowhead Pharmaceuticals, Dicerna, Alnylam Pharmaceuticals, Amgen, and Sylentis. These medications cover a variety of targets via RNAi and diseases.

Investigational RNAi therapeutics in development:

Drug	Target	Delivery System	Disease	Phase	Status	Company	Identifier
ALN–VSP02	KSP and VEGF	LNP	Solid tumours	I	Completed	Alnylam Pharmaceuticals	NCT01158079
siRNA–EphA2–DOPC	EphA2	LNP	Advanced cancers	I	Recruiting	MD Anderson Cancer Center	NCT01591356
Atu027	PKN3	LNP	Solid tumours	I	Completed	Silence Therapeutics	NCT00938574
TKM–080301	PLK1	LNP	Cancer	I	Recruiting	Tekmira Pharmaceutical	NCT01262235
TKM–100201	VP24, VP35, Zaire Ebola L-polymerase	LNP	Ebola-virus infection	I	Recruiting	Tekmira Pharmaceutical	NCT01518881
ALN–RSV01	RSV nucleocapsid	Naked siRNA	Respiratory syncytial virus infections	II	Completed	Alnylam Pharmaceuticals	NCT00658086
PRO-040201	ApoB	LNP	Hypercholesterolaemia	I	Terminated	Tekmira Pharmaceutical	NCT00927459
ALN–PCS02	PCSK9	LNP	Hypercholesterolaemia	I	Completed	Alnylam Pharmaceuticals	NCT01437059
ALN–TTR02	TTR	LNP	Transthyretin-mediated amyloidosis	II	Recruiting	Alnylam Pharmaceuticals	NCT01617967
CALAA-01	RRM2	Cyclodextrin NP	Solid tumours	I	Active	Calando Pharmaceuticals	NCT00689065
TD101	K6a (N171K mutation)	Naked siRNA	Pachyonychia congenita	I	Completed	Pachyonychia Congenita Project	NCT00716014
AGN211745	VEGFR1	Naked siRNA	Age-related macular degeneration, choroidal neovascularization	II	Terminated	Allergan	NCT00395057
QPI-1007	CASP2	Naked siRNA	Optic atrophy, non-arteritic anterior ischaemic optic neuropathy	I	Completed	Quark Pharmaceuticals	NCT01064505
I5NP	p53	Naked siRNA	Kidney injury, acute renal failure	I	Completed	Quark Pharmaceuticals	NCT00554359
			Delayed graft function, complications of kidney transplant	I, II	Recruiting	Quark Pharmaceuticals	NCT00802347
PF-655 (PF-04523655)	RTP801 (Proprietary target)	Naked siRNA	Choroidal neovascularization, diabetic retinopathy, diabetic macular oedema	II	Active	Quark Pharmaceuticals	NCT01445899
siG12D LODER	KRAS	LODER polymer	Pancreatic cancer	II	Recruiting	Silenseed	NCT01676259
Bevasiranib	VEGF	Naked siRNA	Diabetic macular oedema, macular degeneration	II	Completed	Opko Health	NCT00306904
SYL1001	TRPV1	Naked siRNA	Ocular pain, dry-eye syndrome	I, II	Recruiting	Sylentis	NCT01776658
SYL040012	ADRB2	Naked siRNA	Ocular hypertension, open-angle glaucoma	II	Recruiting	Sylentis	NCT01739244
CEQ508	CTNNB1	Escherichia coli-carrying shRNA	Familial adenomatous polyposis	I, II	Recruiting	Marina Biotech	Unknown
RXi-109	CTGF	Self-delivering RNAi compound	Cicatrix scar prevention	I	Recruiting	RXi Pharmaceuticals	NCT01780077
ALN–TTRsc	TTR	siRNA–GalNAc conjugate	Transthyretin-mediated amyloidosis	I	Recruiting	Alnylam Pharmaceuticals	NCT01814839
ARC-520	Conserved regions of HBV	DPC	HBV	I	Recruiting	Arrowhead Research	NCT01872065

===== Legal categorization and legal issues in a near future =====
Currently, both miRNA and SiRNA are currently chemically synthesized and so, are legally categorized inside EU and in USA as "simple" medicinal products. But as bioengineered siRNA (BERAs) are in development, these would be classified as biological medicinal products, at least in EU. The development of the BERAs technology raises the question of the categorization of drugs having the same mechanism of action but being produced chemically or biologically. This lack of consistency should be addressed.

=== Drug–drug interactions with siRNA therapeutics ===
As the number of approved RNAi therapeutics has grown, reaching seven in 2025 (patisiran, givosiran, lumasiran, inclisiran, vutrisiran, nedosiran, and fitusiran), a distinct challenge has emerged in assessing drug–drug interactions (DDIs) for this drug class.

Unlike small-molecule drugs, siRNA therapeutics are not major substrates of cytochrome P450 enzymes and do not rely on classical hepatic or renal uptake transporters. Instead, they are metabolized by endogenous endo- and exonucleases to shortened oligonucleotide chains, and their systemic pharmacokinetic parameters often do not reflect target-tissue distribution or pharmacodynamic (PD) outcomes.

A clinically observed example of an unexpected DDI is givosiran, which produced a 2- to 3-fold increase in systemic exposure to cytochrome P450 substrates dextromethorphan (CYP2D6) and caffeine (CYP1A2) in patients with acute intermittent porphyria—an effect not predicted by standard in vitro CYP enzyme studies. The proposed mechanism involves indirect interference with hepatic heme biosynthesis via on-target suppression of aminolevulinate synthase 1 (ALAS1), rather than direct enzyme inhibition.

More broadly, siRNA drugs may compete with endogenous microRNAs (miRNAs) for shared components of the RNA-induced silencing complex (RISC), particularly Argonaute (AGO) proteins. This competition could alter the post-transcriptional gene regulation (PTGR) of ADME-related genes, leading to indirect modulation of the expression of drug-metabolizing enzymes or transporters and causing DDIs with co-administered drugs. Short hairpin RNAs (shRNAs) may additionally compete with pre-miRNAs for the nuclear export protein Exportin-5 (XPO5) and the cytoplasmic ribonuclease Dicer, disrupting global miRNA biogenesis and posing further DDI risk.

The U.S. Food and Drug Administration has issued guidance specific to oligonucleotide therapeutics, recommending assessment of QTc interval prolongation, immunogenicity, organ-impairment effects on PD endpoints, and the potential for RNAi machinery competition as part of the DDI risk framework for this drug class.

==== Delivery mechanisms ====
To achieve the clinical potential of RNAi, siRNA must be efficiently transported to the cells of target tissues. However, there are various barriers that must be fixed before it can be used clinically. For example, "naked" siRNA is susceptible to several obstacles that reduce its therapeutic efficacy. Additionally, once siRNA has entered the bloodstream, naked RNA can be degraded by serum nucleases and can stimulate the innate immune system. Due to its size and highly polyanionic (containing negative charges at several sites) nature, unmodified siRNA molecules cannot readily enter the cells through the cell membrane. Therefore, artificial or nanoparticle encapsulated siRNA must be used. If siRNA is transferred across the cell membrane, unintended toxicities can occur if therapeutic doses are not optimized, and siRNAs can exhibit off-target effects (e.g. unintended downregulation of genes with partial sequence complementarity). Even after entering the cells, repeated dosing is required since their effects are diluted at each cell division. In response to these potential issues and barriers, two approaches help facilitate siRNA delivery to target cells: lipid nanoparticles and conjugates.

===== Lipid nanoparticles =====
Lipid nanoparticles (LNPs) are based on liposome-like structures that are typically made of an aqueous center surrounded by a lipid shell. A subset of liposomal structures used for delivery drugs to tissues rest in large unilamellar vesicles (LUVs) which may be 100 nm in size. LNP delivery mechanisms have become an increasing source of encasing nucleic acids and may include plasmids, CRISPR and mRNA.

The first approved use of lipid nanoparticles as a drug delivery mechanism began in 2018 with the siRNA drug patisiran, developed by Alnylam Pharmaceuticals. Dicerna Pharmaceuticals, Persomics, Sanofi and Sirna Therapeutics also worked to bring RNAi therapies to market.

Other recent applications include two FDA approved COVID-19 vaccines: mRNA-1273, developed by Moderna. and BNT162b, developed by a collaboration between Pfizer and BioNtech. These two vaccines use lipid nanoparticles to deliver antigen mRNA. Encapsulating the mRNA molecule in lipid nanoparticles was a critical breakthrough for producing viable mRNA vaccines, solving a number of key technical barriers in delivering the mRNA molecule into the host cell as distributed through apolipoprotein E (apoE) in the low-density lipoprotein receptor (LDLR). In December 2020, Novartis announced that positive results from phase III efficacy studies deemed inclisiran was a treatment for heterozygous familial hypercholesterolemia (HeFH) and atherosclerotic cardiovascular disease (ASCVD).

===== Conjugates =====
In addition to LNPs, RNAi therapeutics have targeted delivery through siRNA conjugates (e.g., GalNAc, carbohydrates, peptides, aptamers, antibodies). Therapeutics using siRNA conjugates have been developed for rare or genetic diseases such as acute hepatic porphyria (AHP), hemophilia, primary hyperoxaluria (PH) and hereditary ATTR amyloidosis as well as other cardiometabolic diseases such as hypertension and non-alcoholic steatohepatitis (NASH).

==== Viral infection ====
Antiviral treatment is one of the earliest proposed RNAi-based medical applications, and two different types have been developed. The first type is to target viral RNAs. Many studies have shown that targeting viral RNAs can suppress the replication of numerous viruses, including HIV, HPV, hepatitis A, hepatitis B, influenza virus, respiratory syncytial virus (RSV), SARS coronavirus (SARS-CoV), adenovirus and measles virus. The other strategy is to block the initial viral entries by targeting the host cell genes. For example, suppression of chemokine receptors (CXCR4 and CCR5) on host cells can prevent HIV viral entry.

==== Cancer ====
While traditional chemotherapy can effectively kill cancer cells, lack of specificity for discriminating normal cells and cancer cells in these treatments usually cause severe side effects. Numerous studies have demonstrated that RNAi can provide a more specific approach to inhibit tumor growth by targeting cancer-related genes (i.e., oncogene). It has also been proposed that RNAi can enhance the sensitivity of cancer cells to chemotherapeutic agents, providing a combinatorial therapeutic approach with chemotherapy. Another potential RNAi-based treatment is to inhibit cell invasion and migration.

Compared with chemotherapy or other anti-cancer drugs, there are a lot of advantages of siRNA drug. SiRNA acts on the post-transcriptional stage of gene expression, so it does not modify or change DNA in a deleterious effect. SiRNA can also be used to produce a specific response in a certain type of way, such as by downgrading suppression of gene expression. In a single cancer cell, siRNA can cause dramatic suppression of gene expression with just several copies. This happens by silencing cancer-promoting genes with RNAi, as well as targeting an mRNA sequence.

RNAi drugs treat cancer by silencing certain cancer promoting genes. This is done by complementing the cancer genes with the RNAi, such as keeping the mRNA sequences in accordance with the RNAi drug. Ideally, RNAi is should be injected and/or chemically modified so the RNAi can reach cancer cells more efficiently. RNAi uptake and regulation is controlled by the kidneys.

==== Neurological diseases ====
RNAi strategies also show potential for treating neurodegenerative diseases. Studies in cells and in mouse have shown that specifically targeting Amyloid beta-producing genes (e.g. BACE1 and APP) by RNAi can significantly reduced the amount of Aβ peptide which is correlated with the cause of Alzheimer's disease. In addition, this silencing-based approaches also provide promising results in treatment of Parkinson's disease and Polyglutamine disease.

==== Stimulation of immune response ====
The human immune system is divided into two separate branches: the innate immune system and the adaptive immune system. The innate immune system is the first defense against infection and responds to pathogens in a generic fashion. On the other hand, the adaptive immune system, a system that was evolved later than the innate, is composed mainly of highly specialized B and T cells that are trained to react to specific portions of pathogenic molecules.

The challenge between old pathogens and new has helped create a system of guarded cells and particles that are called safe framework. This framework has given humans an army of systems that search out and destroy invader particles, such as pathogens, microscopic organisms, parasites, and infections. The mammalian safe framework has developed to incorporate siRNA as a tool to indicate viral contamination, which has allowed siRNA is create an intense innate immune response.

siRNA is controlled by the innate immune system, which can be divided into the acute inflammatory responses and antiviral responses. The inflammatory response is created with signals from small signaling molecules, or cytokines. These include interleukin-1 (IL-1), interleukin-6 (IL-6), interleukin-12 (IL-12) and tumor necrosis factor α (TNF-α). The innate immune system generates inflammation and antiviral responses, which cause the release pattern recognition receptors (PRRs). These receptors help in labeling which pathogens are viruses, fungi, or bacteria. Moreover, the importance of siRNA and the innate immune system is to include more PRRs to help recognize different RNA structures. This makes it more likely for the siRNA to cause an immunostimulant response in the event of the pathogen.

=== Agricultural biotechnology ===
RNAi has been used for a variety of agricultural applications including genetically engineered crops and insecticides. The use of the RNAi pathway has developed numerous products such as foods like Arctic apples, nicotine-free tobacco, decaffeinated coffee, nutrient fortified vegetation and hypoallergenic crops. The emerging use of RNAi has the potential to develop many other products for future use.

==== Genetically engineered crops ====
RNAi has been used to genetically engineer plants to produce lower levels of natural plant toxins. Such techniques take advantage of the stable and heritable RNAi phenotype in plant stocks. Cotton seeds are rich in dietary protein but naturally contain the toxic terpenoid product gossypol, making them unsuitable for human consumption. RNAi has been used to produce cotton stocks whose seeds contain reduced levels of delta-cadinene synthase, a key enzyme in gossypol production, without affecting the enzyme's production in other parts of the plant, where gossypol is itself important in preventing damage from plant pests.

Development efforts have successfully reduced the levels of allergens in tomato plants and fortification of plants such as tomatoes with dietary antioxidants. RNAi silencing of alpha-amylase have also been used to decrease Aspergillus flavus fungal growth in maize which would have otherwise contaminated the kernels with dangerous aflatoxins. Silencing lachrymatory factor synthase in onions has produced tearless onions, and RNAi has been used in BP1 genes in rapeseeds to improve photosynthesis. SBEIIa and SBEIIb genes in wheat have been targeted in wheat in order to produce higher levels of amylose in order to improve bowel function, and Travella et al. 2006 employed RNAi for functional genomics an investigation of hexaploid bread races, while virus-induced gene silencing (VIGS, a subtype of RNAi) was used by Scofield et al. 2005 to investigate the mechanism of resistance provided by Lr21 against wheat leaf rust in hexaploid wheat.

==== Insecticides ====
RNAi is under development as an insecticide, employing multiple approaches, including genetic engineering and topical application. Cells in the midgut of some insects take up the dsRNA molecules in the process referred to as environmental RNAi. In some insects the effect is systemic as the signal spreads throughout the insect's body (referred to as systemic RNAi).

Animals exposed to RNAi at doses millions of times higher than anticipated human exposure levels show no adverse effects. RNAi has varying effects in different species of Lepidoptera (butterflies and moths).

Drosophila spp., Bombyx mori, Locusta spp., Spodoptera spp., Tribolium castaneum, Nilaparvata lugens, Helicoverpa armigera, and Apis mellifera are models that have been widely used to learn how RNAi works within particular taxa of insects. Musca domestica has two Ago2 genes and Glossina morsitans three, as found by Lewis et al. 2016 and Hain et al. 2010. In the case of the miRNA pathway Diuraphis noxia has two Ago1s, M. domestica two Dcr1s, Acyrthosiphon pisum two each of Ago1 and Loqs and Dcr1 and four of Pasha. While in the piRNA, G. morsitans and A. pisum have two or three Ago3s each. This has led to identification of future insecticide development targets, and the modes of action and reasons for insecticide resistance of other insecticides.

===== Transgenic plants =====
Transgenic crops have been made to express dsRNA, carefully chosen to silence crucial genes in target pests. These dsRNAs are designed to affect only insects that express specific gene sequences. As a proof of principle, in 2009 a study showed RNAs that could kill any one of four fruit fly species while not harming the other three.

===== Topical =====
Alternatively dsRNA can be supplied without genetic engineering. One approach is to add them to irrigation water. The molecules are absorbed into the plants' vascular system and poison insects feeding on them. Another approach involves spraying dsRNA like a conventional pesticide. This would allow faster adaptation to resistance. Such approaches would require low cost sources of dsRNAs that do not currently exist.

=== Functional genomics ===
Approaches to the design of genome-wide RNAi libraries can require more sophistication than the design of a single siRNA for a defined set of experimental conditions. Artificial neural networks are frequently used to design siRNA libraries and to predict their likely efficiency at gene knockdown. Mass genomic screening is widely seen as a promising method for genome annotation and has triggered the development of high-throughput screening methods based on microarrays.

=== Genome-scale screening ===
Genome-scale RNAi research relies on high-throughput screening (HTS) technology. RNAi HTS technology allows genome-wide loss-of-function screening and is broadly used in the identification of genes associated with specific phenotypes. This technology has been hailed as a potential second genomics wave, following the first genomics wave of gene expression microarray and single nucleotide polymorphism discovery platforms. One major advantage of genome-scale RNAi screening is its ability to simultaneously interrogate thousands of genes. With the ability to generate a large amount of data per experiment, genome-scale RNAi screening has led to an explosion of data generation rates. Exploiting such large data sets is a fundamental challenge, requiring suitable statistics/bioinformatics methods. The basic process of cell-based RNAi screening includes the choice of an RNAi library, robust and stable cell types, transfection with RNAi agents, treatment/incubation, signal detection, analysis and identification of important genes or therapeutical targets.

== History ==
=== RNAi discovery ===
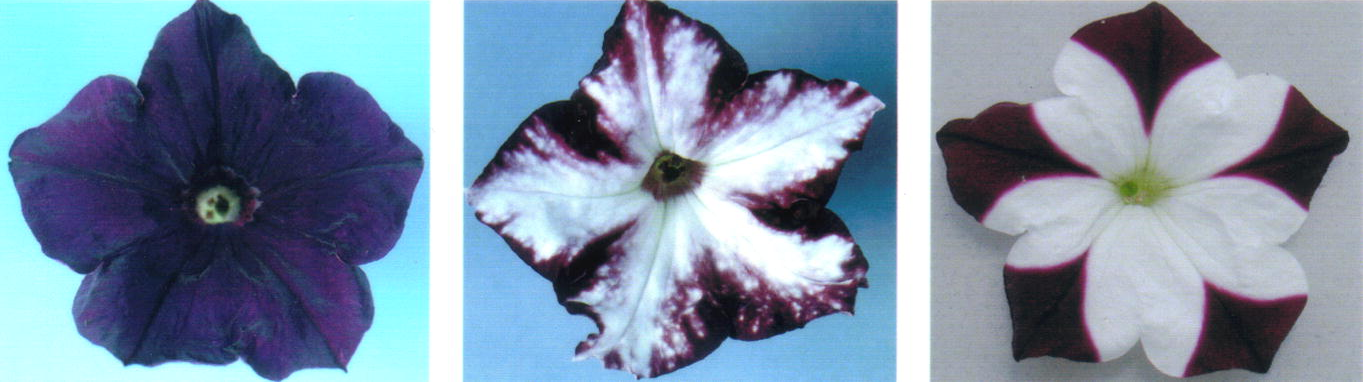
Example petunia plants in which genes for pigmentation are silenced by RNAi. The left plant is wild-type; the right plants contain transgenes that induce suppression of both transgene and endogenous gene expression, giving rise to the unpigmented white areas of the flower.

The process of RNAi was referred to as "co-suppression" and "quelling" when observed prior to the knowledge of an RNA-related mechanism. The discovery of RNAi was preceded first by observations of transcriptional inhibition by antisense RNA expressed in transgenic plants, and more directly by reports of unexpected outcomes in experiments performed by plant scientists in the United States and the Netherlands in the early 1990s. In an attempt to alter flower colors in petunias, researchers introduced additional copies of a gene encoding chalcone synthase, a key enzyme for flower pigmentation into petunia plants of normally pink or violet flower color. The overexpressed gene was expected to result in darker flowers, but instead caused some flowers to have less visible purple pigment, sometimes in variegated patterns, indicating that the activity of chalcone synthase had been substantially decreased or became suppressed in a context-specific manner. Another early observation of RNAi came from a study of the fungus Neurospora crassa, although it was not immediately recognized as related. Further investigation of the phenomenon in plants indicated that the downregulation was due to post-transcriptional inhibition of gene expression via an increased rate of mRNA degradation. This phenomenon was called co-suppression of gene expression, but the molecular mechanism remained unknown.

Not long after, plant virologists working on improving plant resistance to viral diseases observed a similar unexpected phenomenon. While it was known that plants expressing virus-specific proteins showed enhanced tolerance or resistance to viral infection, it was not expected that plants carrying only short, non-coding regions of viral RNA sequences would show similar levels of protection. Researchers believed that viral RNA produced by transgenes could also inhibit viral replication. The reverse experiment, in which short sequences of plant genes were introduced into viruses, showed that the targeted gene was suppressed in an infected plant. This phenomenon was labeled "virus-induced gene silencing" (VIGS), and the set of such phenomena were collectively called post transcriptional gene silencing.

After these initial observations in plants, laboratories searched for this phenomenon in other organisms. The first instance of RNA silencing in animals was documented in 1996, when Guo and Kemphues observed that, by introducing sense and antisense RNA to par-1 mRNA in Caenorhabditis elegans caused degradation of the par-1 message. It was thought that this degradation was triggered by single-stranded RNA (ssRNA), but two years later, in 1998, Fire and Mello discovered that this ability to silence the par-1 gene expression was actually triggered by double-stranded RNA (dsRNA). Craig C. Mello and Andrew Fire's 1998 Nature paper reported a potent gene silencing effect after injecting double stranded RNA into C. elegans. In investigating the regulation of muscle protein production, they observed that neither mRNA nor antisense RNA injections had an effect on protein production, but double-stranded RNA successfully silenced the targeted gene. As a result of this work, they coined the term RNAi. This discovery represented the first identification of the causative agent for the phenomenon. Fire and Mello were awarded the 2006 Nobel Prize in Physiology or Medicine.

=== RNAi therapeutics ===
Just after Fire and Mello's ground-breaking discovery, Elbashir et al. discovered, by using synthetically made siRNA, it was possible to target the silencing of specific sequences in a gene, rather than silencing the entire gene. Only a year later, McCaffrey and colleagues demonstrated that this sequence-specific silencing had therapeutic applications by targeting a sequence from the Hepatitis C virus in transgenic mice. Since then, multiple researchers have been attempting to expand the therapeutic applications of RNAi, specifically looking to target genes that cause various types of cancer. By 2006, the first applications to reach clinical trials were in the treatment of macular degeneration and respiratory syncytial virus. Four years later the first-in-human Phase I clinical trial was started, using a nanoparticle delivery system to target solid tumors.

The FDA approved the first siRNA-based drug (patisiran) in 2018. Givosiran and lumasiran later won FDA approval for the treatment of AHP and PH1 in 2019 and 2020, respectively. Inclisiran received EMA approval in 2020 for the treatment of high cholesterol and is currently under review by the FDA.

== See also ==
- DNA-directed RNA interference
