= Cottonseed =

Seed of the cotton plant

Production of cotton seed

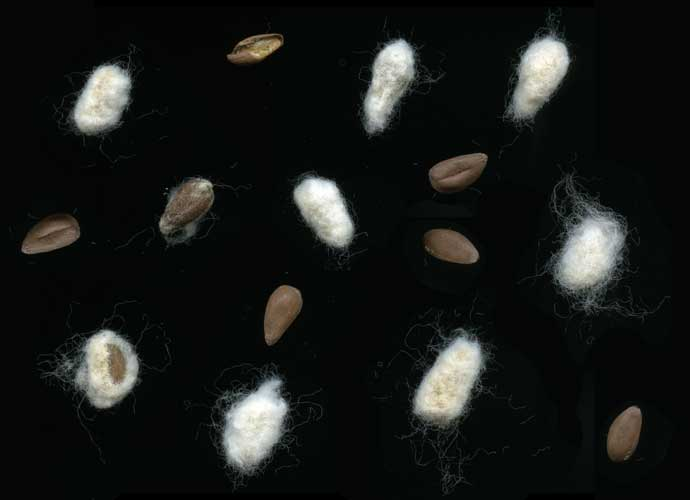
Cottonseed: brown seeds are ginned from the fiber boll; white seeds are still wrapped in cotton linters

Cottonseed is the seed of the cotton plant, formed inside the cotton boll. Cottonseed is the source of cottonseed oil and cottonseed meal. Cottonseed, like the rest of the cotton plant, contains high amounts of gossypol that can be toxic to humans. Cottonseed has been historically used as an ersatz protein-rich food in cotton-producing regions, but the modern biofortification of cotton cultivars with tolerable gossypol levels has particular relevance to impoverished cotton producers.

== Composition ==
Cottonseed develops from the ovules within the locule of the cotton boll, a botanical fruit. Removed from the boll, seeds are initially covered in fine cotton linters, growing from the seed coat. Once the linters are removed, the seed is a brown ovoid weighing about a tenth of a gram.

The cotyledon makes up 60% of the weight of the seed without linters, the seed coat 32%, and the remaining 8% the radicle and hypocotyl. The chemical composition is 20% protein, 20% oil and 3.5% starch.

For unit weight of cotton fiber, about 1.6 units of seeds are produced. The seeds are about 15% of the value of the crop and are pressed to make oil and used as ruminant animal feed. About 5% of the seeds are used for sowing the next crop.

== Uses ==
=== Feed products for livestock ===
Cottonseed is crushed in the mill after removing lint from the cotton boll. The seed is further crushed to remove any remaining linters or strands of minute cotton fibers. The seeds are further hulled and polished to release the soft and high-protein meat. These hulls of the cottonseed are then mixed with other types of grains to make it suitable for the livestock feed. Cottonseed meal and hulls are one of the most abundantly available natural sources of protein and fiber used to feed livestock.

Cottonseed as supplement is marketed primarily towards agricultural sectors that feed dairy cows. Some feedlots use corn to supplement the forage diets of cows; high starch diets, such as those in corn supplemented diets, can lead to liver damage in cows. Cottonseed is considered a safer alternative to corn supplemented diets due to its low starch content. Cottonseed as livestock feed must also be monitored for safety since the foodstuff is high in energy/fat and too much fat content in a cow's diet can disrupt its ability to digest fiber, leading to other complications.

Cottonseed meal

Cottonseed meal is a good source of protein. The two types of meal extraction processes are solvent extraction and mechanical extraction. Most of the meal is extracted mechanically through cottonseed kernels. The flaked cottonseed kernels are put under high pressure through a screw inside a constantly revolving barrel. The screw pushes out the oil through the openings made in the barrel. The dry pieces left in the barrel are preserved and ground into meal. During the solvent extraction process, the cottonseed kernels are subjected to fine grinding by pushing them through an expander and then the solvent is used to extract most of the oil. The solvent-extracted meals have a lower fat content of 0.5% than the mechanically extracted meals with a fat content of 2.0%. Cottonseed meal contains more arginine than soybean meal. Cottonseed meal can be used in multiple ways: either alone or mixed with other plant and animal protein sources.

Cottonseed hulls

The outer coverings of the cottonseed, known as cottonseed hulls, are removed from the cotton kernels before the oil is extracted. Cottonseed hulls are an excellent source of livestock feed as they contain about 8% cotton linters, which are nearly 100% cellulose. They require no grinding and easily mix with other feed sources. As they are easy to handle, their transportation cost is also fairly low. Whole cottonseed is another feed product of cottonseed used to feed livestock. It is the seed left after the separation of long fibres from cotton, and serves as a good source of cellulose for ruminants. Whole cottonseed leads to high production of milk and fat when fed to a high-producing dairy cow. It can be cost effective and provides nutrients with a high protein value of about 23%, crude fibre value of 25%, and high energy value of 20%. Whole cottonseed serves as a highly digestible feed which also improves the reproductive performance in livestock. Pima cottonseed, which is free of linters by default, and delinted cottonseed are other types of cottonseed feed products.

=== Consumption by humans ===
Cottonseeds are toxic to humans and most animals due to the presence of gossypol, though it is tolerated by cows, and cannot be consumed by humans without processing. In order to make cottonseed oil fit for human consumption, it must be processed to remove the gossypol. In October 2018, the United States Department of Agriculture approved for farming a genetically modified version of cottonseed developed by Dr. Keerti Rathore of Texas A&M AgriLife Research that contains ultra-low amounts of gossypol in its seeds. The toxin remains present in other parts of the plant to protect against pests, but is not yet approved by the Food and Drug Administration for human consumption.

=== Cottonseed oil ===
The refined seed oil extracted from the kernels can be used as a cooking oil or in salad dressings. It is also used in the production of shortening and margarine. Cotton grown for the extraction of cottonseed oil is one of major crops grown around the world for the production of oil, after palm, soy, rapeseed (canola), sunflower and peanut (groundnut).

=== Fertilizer ===
The cottonseed meal after being dried can be used as a dry organic fertilizer, as it contains 41% protein. It can also be mixed with other natural fertilizers to improve its quality and use. Due to its natural nutrients, cottonseed meal improves soil's texture and helps retain moisture. It serves as a good source of natural fertilizers in dry areas due to its tendency of keeping the soil moist. Cottonseed meal and cottonseed ashes are also sometimes used to supplement organic hydroponic solutions. Cottonseed meal fertilizers can be used for roses, camellias, or vegetable gardens.

=== Cosmetics ===
The fine quality oil extracted from cottonseed during the extraction process is also used in cosmetics, such as moisturizing lotions and bath soaps.
