= Delta-cadinene synthase =

(+)-δ-cadinene synthase

Identifiers
- EC no.: 4.2.3.13
- CAS no.: 166800-09-5

Databases
- IntEnz: IntEnz view
- BRENDA: BRENDA entry
- ExPASy: NiceZyme view
- KEGG: KEGG entry
- MetaCyc: metabolic pathway
- PRIAM: profile
- PDB structures: RCSB PDB PDBe PDBsum
- Gene Ontology: AmiGO / QuickGO
Search
- PMC: articles
- PubMed: articles
- NCBI: proteins

The enzyme (+)-δ-cadinene synthase (EC 4.2.3.13) catalyzes the chemical reaction

(2E,6E)-farnesyl diphosphate $\rightleftharpoons$ (+)-δ-cadinene + diphosphate

This enzyme belongs to the family of lyases, specifically those carbon-oxygen lyases acting on phosphates. The systematic name of this enzyme class is (2E,6E)-farnesyl-diphosphate diphosphate-lyase (cyclizing, (+)-δ-cadinene-forming). This enzyme participates in terpenoid biosynthesis. It employs one cofactor, magnesium.

δ-Cadinene synthase, a sesquiterpene cyclase, is an enzyme expressed in plants that catalyzes a cyclization reaction in terpenoid biosynthesis. The enzyme cyclizes farnesyl diphosphate to δ-cadinene and releases pyrophosphate.

δ-Cadinene synthase is one of the key steps in the synthesis of gossypol, a toxic terpenoid produced in cotton seeds. Recently, cotton plants that stably underexpress the enzyme in seeds have been developed using RNA interference techniques, producing a plant that had been proposed as a rich source of dietary protein for developing countries.
