= RNAi nanoparticles to target cancer =

Cancer treatments may vary depending on what type of cancer is being targeted, but one challenge remains in all of them: it is incredibly difficult to target without killing good cells. Cancer drugs and therapies all have very low selective toxicity. However, with the help of nanotechnology and RNA silencing, new and better treatments may be on the horizon for certain forms of cancer.

== Considerations ==
The main obstacle in using RNAi technology for the treatment of cancer is protecting the RNAi. It is very fragile, quickly metabolized, and it has to efficiently be delivered to the target cells in vivo. This is why nanoparticles are being used. The nanoparticles currently used in experimental trials are usually nanoplexes, polyplexes, lipoplexes, or micelles. These four major types of nanoparticles are all nonionic lipids. Nonionic lipids are safe, nontoxic and biocompatible. Nanoplexes involve the nucleic acid (RNAi) being associated with the particle or encapsulated by it. Polyplexes are core-shell type nanoparticles. Lipoplexes are liposome structures characterized by a bilayer lipid membrane. Lastly, micelles result from electrostatic interaction between nucleic acids and copolymers.

== Current research ==
=== Ovarian Clear Cell Carcinoma ===
Chemokines are used in the communication between cells. In the case of ovarian clear cell carcinoma, gro-α and its receptor have been found to be overexpressed. This pro-inflammatory cytokine, when found in excess, is involved in tumor cell migration, invasion, and eventually metastasis.

A modified nanoparticle with siRNA is now being researched and has been shown to effectively shut down the expression of gro-α. They are modified with FSH β which has a high selectivity for FSHR-positive ovarian cancer cells. The nanoparticles are aiding in delivery of the siRNA to the correct place, giving them a high selective toxicity.

=== Multidrug-resistant cancer cells ===
Multidrug resistance in cancer cells is thought to be the primary reason for the poor efficacy of cancer chemotherapy. Drug resistance is due to expression of the gene MDR-1. These gene codes for membrane-bound proteins called ABC transporters. One example of an ABC transporter is P-glycoprotein (P-gp). These transporters use ATP to efflux drugs out of the cell before they can exhibit their cytotoxic effects.

Nanoparticles with MDR-1 silencing siRNA along with a cytotoxic drug PTX. Using this nanoparticle for delivery, silencing of the MDR-1 gene was achieved. Also, the cytotoxic effect of PTX was enhanced, probably due to an increase in intracellular drug accumulation.

=== Prostate cancer ===
In prostate cancer, the androgen receptor (AR) plays a critical role in progression of the cancer. Lipid nanoparticles (LNPs) are being considered for delivering siRNA to silence AR. The most effective LNP to be found in vivo contains an ionizable cationic lipid 2,2-dilinoleyl-4-(2-dimethylaminoethyl)-[1,3]-dioxolane (DLin-KC2-DMA).

Serum prostate specific antigen (PSA) is an antigen that is present in high levels in prostate cancer. PSA levels following injection of these nanoparticles decreased and AR gene expression in tumors decreased.

=== Papillary thyroid cancer ===
Papillary thyroid carcinoma is targeted using a polyplex nanoparticle. The core consists of biodegradable poly isobutylcyanoacrylate polymer and a shell of chitosan. After intravenous injection of this type of nanoparticle loaded with antisense siRNA, tumor growth was almost stopped entirely. All other control experiments showed a ten-times increase in tumor size.
