= Cottonseed meal =

Cotton byproduct

Cottonseed meal is the byproduct remaining after cotton is ginned, the oil extracted, and the seeds crushed. Cottonseed meal is usually used for animal feed and in organic fertilizers.

Cottonseed meal is about 40 percent protein by weight. Compared to cellulose and lignin, proteins decompose rapidly and release nitrogen. Unweathered, light-colored plant material such as hay, autumn tree leaves, sawdust, straw, woodchips, and wood shavings are nitrogen deficient, and do not decompose easily. Cottonseed meal, which is rich in nitrogen, is often mixed with these types of materials to improve decomposition speed.

Whole cottonseed can be fed to ruminants like cattle, goats, and sheep but should not be fed to poultry. Cottonseed meal should only be fed to adult ruminants, as immature animals have less well-developed digestive systems. Cottonseed meal also contains gossypol and cyclopropenoid fatty acids. Gossypol is also highly toxic to monogastrics. Cyclopropenoid fatty acids can have a number of effects, some adverse, such as reduced fertility in laying hens; alterations in the composition of fatty acids in blood plasma, the heart, the liver, and the ovaries; the slowing of growth in young animals; and B vitamin deficiency. The protein in cottonseed meal is also low in lysine.

Glandless cottonseed was developed in the early 1960s. Cottonseed meal derived from glandless cottonseed contains almost no gossypol.
