= Cadinene =

Cadinenes
α-Cadinene
α-Cadinene
β-Cadinene
γ-Cadinene
δ-Cadinene

Names
- IUPAC names: (1S,4aR,8aR)-4,7-dimethyl-1-(propan-2-yl)- 1,2,4a,5,6,8a-hexahydronaphthalene (α-cadinene); (1S,4aR,8aR)-7-methyl-4-methylidene-1-(propan-2-yl)-1,2,3,4,4a,5,6,8a-octahydronaphthalene (γ-cadinene); (1S,8aR)-4,7-dimethyl-1-(propan-2-yl)-1,2,3,5,6,8a-hexahydronaphthalene (δ-cadinene)

Identifiers
CAS Number	α: 24406-05-1; β: 11044-40-9; γ: 39029-41-9; δ: 1460-97-5
3D model (JSmol)	α: Interactive image; β: Interactive image; γ: Interactive image; δ: Interactive image
ChEBI	α: CHEBI:80749; β: CHEBI:27723; γ: CHEBI:63203; δ: CHEBI:15385
ChEMBL	β: ChEMBL3120653; δ: ChEMBL445759
ChemSpider	α: 16737087; β: 10207; γ: 83342; δ: 389830
KEGG	α: C16815; β: C09625; γ: C19738; δ: C06394
PubChem CID	α: 12306048; β: 10657; γ: 92313; δ: 441005
UNII	α: X650G04I0A; β: Z07LA0GY4J; γ: 2GHT32E0JU; δ: 7848KI47OS
- InChI: α: InChI=1S/C15H24/c1-10(2)13-8-6-12(4)14-7-5-11(3)9-15(13)14/h6,9-10,13-15H,5,7-8H2,1-4H3/t13-,14-,15-/m0/s1 Key: QMAYBMKBYCGXDH-KKUMJFAQSA-N; β: InChI=1S/C15H24/c1-10(2)13-8-6-12(4)14-7-5-11(3)9-15(13)14/h5-6,10,13-15H,7-9H2,1-4H3/t13-,14-,15-/m0/s1 Key: USDOQCCMRDNVAH-KKUMJFAQSA-N; γ: InChI=1S/C15H24/c1-10(2)13-8-6-12(4)14-7-5-11(3)9-15(13)14/h9-10,13-15H,4-8H2,1-3H3/t13-,14-,15-/m1/s1 Key: WRHGORWNJGOVQY-RBSFLKMASA-N; δ: InChI=1S/C15H24/c1-10(2)13-8-6-12(4)14-7-5-11(3)9-15(13)14/h9-10,13,15H,5-8H2,1-4H3/t13-,15-/m0/s1 Key: FUCYIEXQVQJBKY-ZFWWWQNUSA-N
- SMILES: α: CC1=C[C@@H]2[C@@H](CC1)C(=CC[C@H]2C(C)C)C; β: CC1=CC[C@@H]2[C@@H](C1)[C@@H](CC=C2C)C(C)C; γ: CC1=C[C@H]2[C@H](CC1)C(=C)CC[C@@H]2C(C)C; δ: CC1=C[C@H]2[C@@H](CCC(=C2CC1)C)C(C)C

Properties
Chemical formula	C_{15}H_{24}
Molar mass	204.357 g·mol^{−1}
- Except where otherwise noted, data are given for materials in their standard state (at 25 °C [77 °F], 100 kPa). verify (what is ?) Infobox references

Cadinenes are a group of isomeric hydrocarbons that occur in a wide variety of essential oil-producing plants. The name is derived from that of the Cade juniper (Juniperus oxycedrus L.), the wood of which yields an oil from which cadinene isomers were first isolated.

Chemically, the cadinenes are bicyclic sesquiterpenes. The term cadinene has sometimes also been used in a broad sense to refer to any sesquiterpene with the so-called cadalane (4-isopropyl-1,6-dimethyldecahydronaphthalene) carbon skeleton. Because of the large number of known double-bond and stereochemical isomers, this class of compounds has been subdivided into four subclasses based on the relative stereochemistry at the isopropyl group and the two bridgehead carbon atoms. The name cadinene is now properly used only for the first subclass below, which includes the compounds originally isolated from cade oil. Only one enantiomer of each subclass is depicted, with the understanding that the other enantiomer bears the same subclass name.

Cadalane skeleton

Cadinane stereochemistry

Muurolane stereochemistry

Amorphane stereochemistry

Bulgarane stereochemistry
