= Thermo Fisher Scientific =

Provisioner of scientific consumables, equipment, and services

Thermo Fisher Scientific Inc.
- Type: Public
- Traded as: NYSE: TMO; S&P 100 component; S&P 500 component
- Industry: Laboratory equipment; Biotechnology; Chemicals; Pharmaceutical; healthcare
- Predecessors: Fisher Scientific; Thermo Electron
- Founded: 1956; 70 years ago
- Headquarters: Waltham, Massachusetts, U.S.
- Area served: Worldwide
- Key people: Marc N. Casper (chairman & CEO); Gianluca Pettiti (president & COO); Ryan Snyder (CIO)
- Products: Analytical/other equipment and instruments, laboratory reagents and consumables, science software and services—for research, discovery, analysis, and manufacturing (incl. pharmaceutical and diagnostic products)
- Revenue: ▲US$44.56 billion (2025)
- Operating income: ▲US$7.746 billion (2025)
- Net income: ▲US$6.704 billion (2025)
- Total assets: ▲US$110.3 billion (2025)
- Total equity: ▲US$53.41 billion (2025)
- Number of employees: c. 125,000 (2025)
- Website: www.thermofisher.com

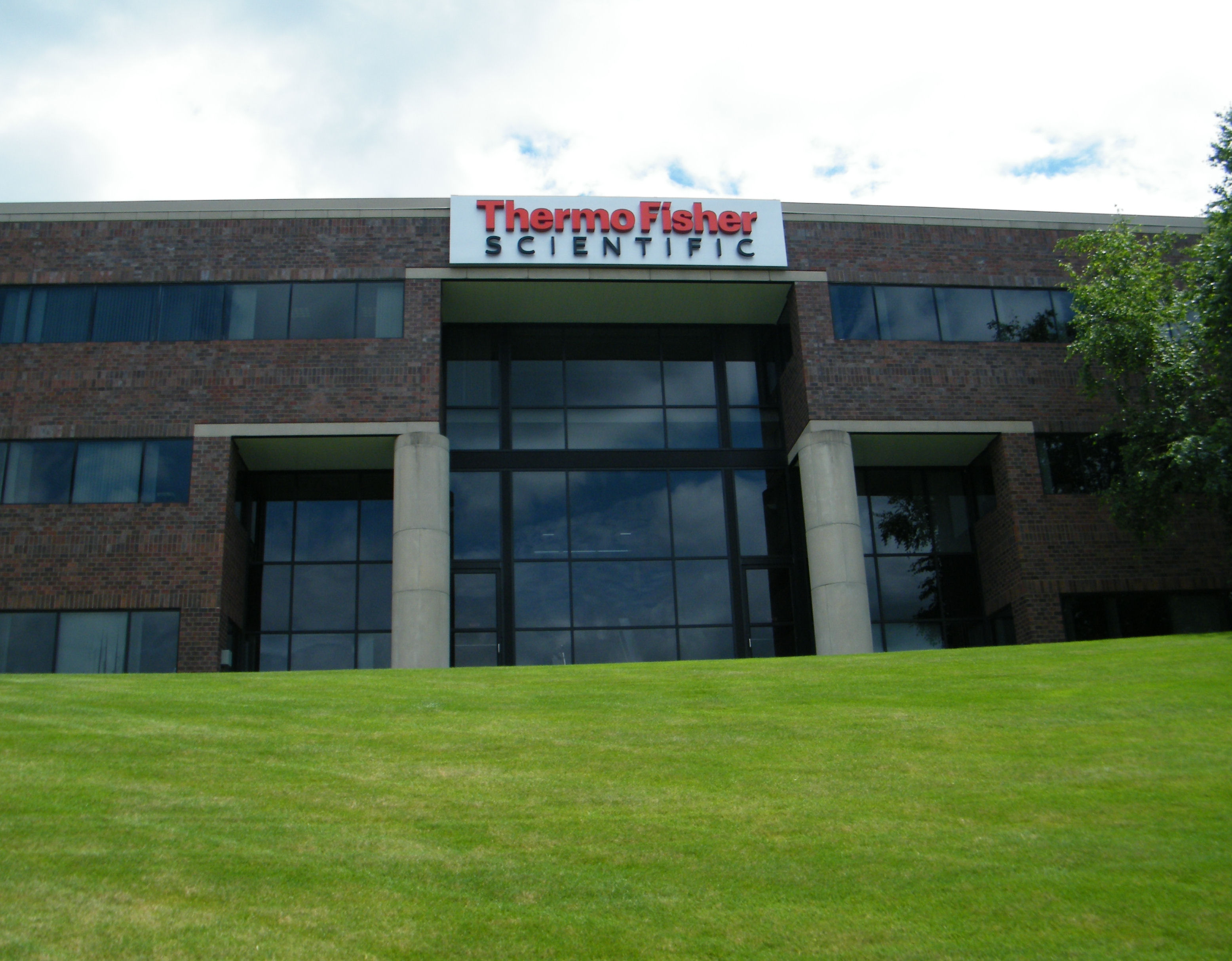
Thermo Fisher Scientific's previous headquarters in Waltham, Massachusetts

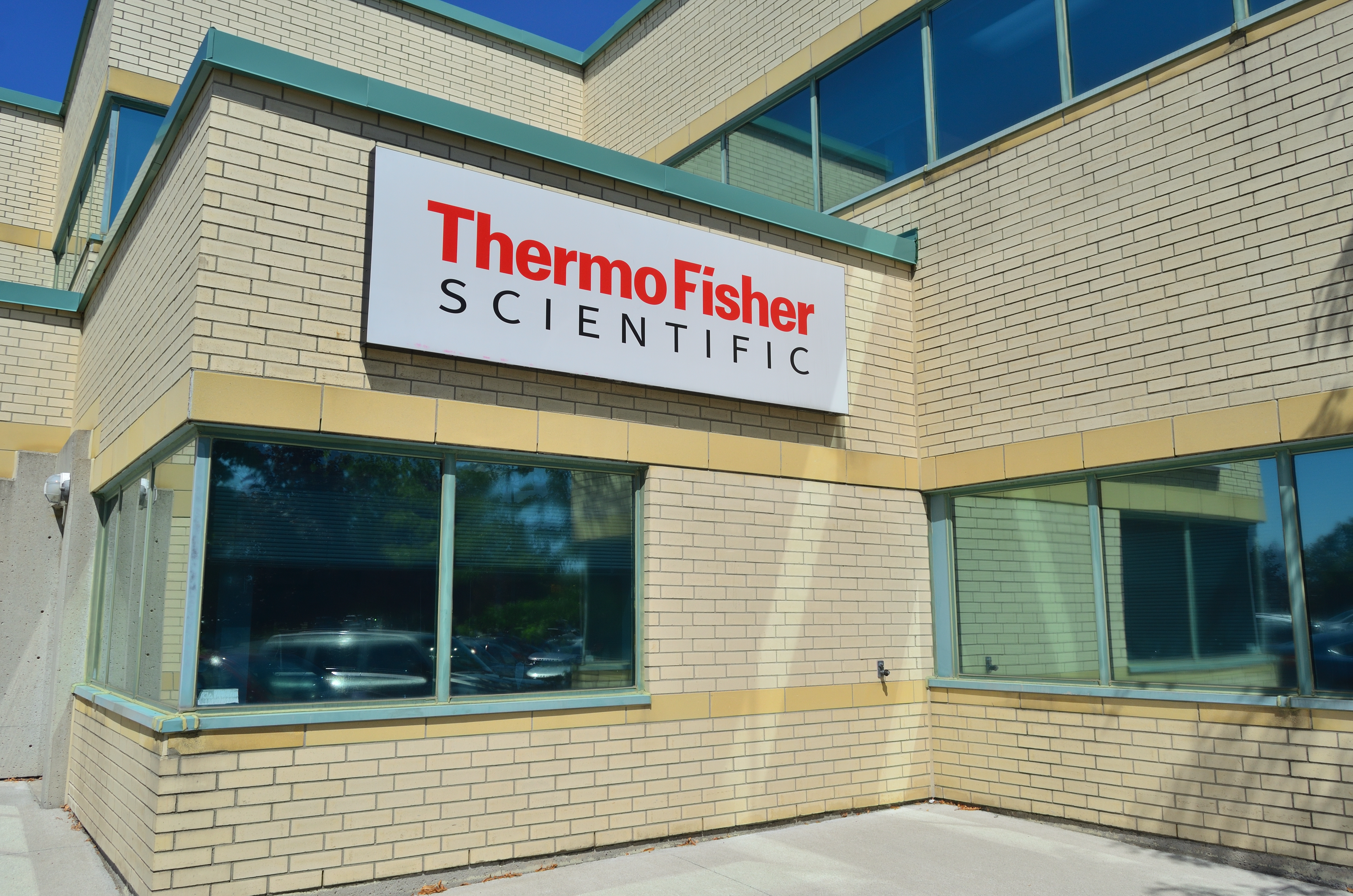
Thermo Fisher Scientific office in Canada

Thermo Fisher Scientific Inc. is an American life science and clinical research company. It is a global supplier of analytical instruments, clinical development solutions, specialty diagnostics, laboratory, pharmaceutical and biotechnology services. Based in Waltham, Massachusetts, Thermo Fisher was formed through the merger of Thermo Electron and Fisher Scientific in 2006. Thermo Fisher Scientific has acquired other reagent, consumable, instrumentation, and service providers, including Life Technologies Corporation (2013), Alfa Aesar (2015), Affymetrix (2016), FEI Company (2016), BD Advanced Bioprocessing (2018), and PPD (2021).

It ranked 106th on the Fortune 500 list based on its 2025 annual revenue of $44.556 billion.

== History ==
=== Predecessors and merger ===
Thermo Electron was co-founded in 1956 by George N. Hatsopoulos and Peter M Nomikos. Hatsopoulos received a PhD from MIT in mechanical engineering and Nomikos was a Harvard Business School graduate. The company focused on providing analytical and laboratory products.

Fisher Scientific was founded in 1902 by Chester G. Fisher from Pittsburgh. It focused on providing laboratory equipment, chemicals, supplies and services used in healthcare, scientific research, safety, and education.

On May 8, 2006, Thermo Electron and Fisher Scientific announced that they would merge in a tax-free, stock-for-stock exchange; the merged company was named Thermo Fisher Scientific, and had about 30,000 employees, and reported US$9 billion in combined revenue. On November 9, 2006, the companies announced that the merger had been completed. However, the Federal Trade Commission ruled that this acquisition was anti-competitive regarding centrifugal evaporators, requiring Fisher to divest Genevac. In April 2007, Genevac was sold to Riverlake Partners LLC and the merger closed with FTC approval.

The company's products are sold under the brand names of Thermo Scientific, Fisher Scientific, and several other recognized brand names (e.g. Applied Biosystems, Invitrogen, Patheon, PPD, and Nalgene).

=== Acquisition history ===
In 1990, Thermo Fisher Scientific (then known as Thermo Instrument Systems) acquired mass spectrometer manufacturer Finnigan Instrument Corporation.

In 2003, the company (then Fisher Scientific International) acquired Perbio Science, a transaction that included brands such as Pierce Biotechnology, HyClone and Endogen. In April 2006, BioImage was acquired by Thermo Fisher Scientific. The merger was complete in November 2006, and technology transfer to a US site was completed during 2007 and 2008. BioImage was established in 1993 as a drug discovery research unit led by Ole Thastrup within Novo Nordisk, from which it spun out of in 1999. It had specialized in developing and selling proprietary bioassays to biopharmaceutical companies and research institutions. It made broad patents covering Enhanced GFP (EGFP), GFP-based biosensors and any genetically encoded protein fusion to a luminophore, with subsequent monitoring of the protein's translocation within a cell as the primary readout for drug discovery assays.

In December 2010, Thermo Fisher Scientific announced its acquisition of Dionex for $2.1 billion.

In May 2011, Thermo Fisher Scientific Inc. bought Phadia to expand into the testing of allergies and autoimmune diseases for €2.47 billion ($3.5 billion) in cash.

In April 2013, after a competitive bidding with Hoffmann-La Roche, Thermo Fisher acquired Life Technologies Corporation for US$13.6 billion in a deal, adding further service lines related to advanced DNA sequencing and genetic testing. Life Technologies was originally formed in 2008 through a $6.7B merger of Invitrogen, a cell therapy, and Applied Biosystems. The company also acquired GIBCO (Grand Island Biological Company) as part of the Life Technologies acquisition.

In February 2015, the company announced it would acquire Advanced Scientifics for $300 million in a cash-deal. ASI designs manufactures, and delivers technologies used in bioprocessing. In June 2015, the company announced its intention to acquire Alfa Aesar, a global manufacturer of research chemicals for $405 million from Johnson Matthey, and the acquisition was completed at the end of September.

In January 2016, the company announced it would acquire Affymetrix for $1.3 billion. On May 27, 2016, the company announced it would acquire FEI Company for $4.2 billion, a manufacturer of electron microscopes. This acquisition is anticipated to close in early 2017 and will contribute to the growth of Thermo's Analytical Instruments business group. In November the company announced it would acquire MTI-GlobalStem, a previously privately held company that develops reagents for cell transfection, neurobiology and stem cell research.

In February 2017, the company acquired Finesse Solutions, Inc., developer of scalable control automation systems and software for bioproduction after receiving early termination of the waiting period under the Hart-Scott-Rodino Antitrust Improvements Act. The transaction was completed a day later. In March, the company announced it would acquire Core Informatics, provider of cloud-based platforms supporting scientific data management. In August, the company acquired Patheon, a contract development and manufacturing organization serving the pharmaceutical and biotechnology sectors, for approximately $7.2 billion. As of 2017, the company had revenues of $20.9 billion, and was a Fortune 500 company.

In September 2018, Thermo Fisher Scientific announced it had signed a definitive agreement with Becton, Dickinson and Company (BDX) to acquire their Advanced Bioprocessing business. This BD business had annualized revenue of approximately $100 million; as of October 16, 2018, it had been integrated into Thermo Fisher's Life Sciences Solutions Segment.

In March 2019, Thermo Fisher Scientific announced its entry into the gene therapy manufacturing market with a $1.7 billion cash acquisition for Brammer Bio. In May 2019, Thermo Fisher Scientific partnered with MMJ International Holdings to manufacture drug products developed by MMJ for the treatment of multiple sclerosis and Huntington's disease. In June, the business announced it would acquire mass spectrometry software provider, HighChem.

In March 2020, Thermo Fisher Scientific received emergency use authorization from the FDA for a test for SARS-CoV-2 to help mitigate the COVID-19 pandemic. Thermo Fisher also partnered with its biopharma customers, including Pfizer and Moderna, to support the development and production of new mRNA-based COVID-19 vaccines.

In March 2020, Thermo Fisher Scientific agreed to purchase Qiagen, a molecular diagnostics company, for $10.1 billion. In July, the offer for Qiagen was raised from €39 to €43 per share (€11.3 billion in total). On August 13, the company announced that its offer to acquire all of the ordinary share had lapsed, and it terminated the acquisition agreement.

In August 2020, Thermo Fisher Scientific opened its new Lenexa facility aimed at boosting the production and manufacturing of COVID-19 testing supplies. In December the business announced it would acquire Phitonex, Inc.

In January 2021, Thermo Fisher Scientific announced it had acquired Belgium-based viral vector manufacturer, Henogen SA, from Groupe Novasep SAS for €725 million in cash and point-of-care molecular diagnostics provider Mesa Biotech, Inc. for up to $550 million.

In April 2021, Thermo Fisher Scientific announced the acquisition of PPD, Inc., a contract research organization, for a total cash purchase price of $17.4 billion-plus the assumption of approximately $3.5 billion of net debt. PPD generated $4.7 billion in revenue during FY 2020, and this transaction, which values their company at approximately $20.9 billion. In November, the business announced it would acquire PharmaFluidics and its μPAC range of micro-chip-based chromatography products.

In January 2022, Thermo Fisher Scientific acquired PeproTech, a developer and manufacturer of recombinant proteins, for $1.85 billion. PeproTech became part of Thermo Fisher’s biosciences business and was integrated into the Life Sciences Solutions Segment.

In October 2022, the company agreed to buy British diagnostics firm, The Binding Site Group, in an all-cash deal for US$2.6 billion from Nordic Capital. The acquisition completed in January 2023.

In July 2023, the business announced it would acquire CorEvitas, LLC from Audax Private Equity for more than $900 million in cash. In August 2023, it was announced Thermo Fisher had completed the acquisition for $912.5 million (in cash).

In October 2023, Thermo Fisher Scientific acquired Olink Holding for $3.1 billion.

In February 2025, Thermo Fisher announced the acquisition of Solventum’s purification and filtration business for $4.1 billion.

In July 2025, Thermo Fisher added drug manufacturing capabilities in the United States through its purchase of a sterile fill-finish and packaging plant from Sanofi in Ridgefield, New Jersey.

In October 2025, Thermo Fisher announced a deal to acquire Clario Holdings—an endpoint data management solutions provider—for $8.88 billion in cash from a shareholder group including Novo Holding. The transaction was expected to close mid-2026.

Thermo Fisher Scientific acquisitions
- Thermo Fisher Scientific (formed in 2006 by the merger of Thermo Electron and Fisher Scientific)
  - Thermo Fisher Scientific
    - Fisher Scientific
      - Scientific Materials Co. (Est 1902)
      - Scientific Supplies, Ltd (Acq 1925)
      - Eimer & Amend (Acq 1940)
      - E. Machlett & Sons (Acq 1957)
      - Janssen Chimica
      - Eastman Kodak Company (Organic Chemicals division)
      - Apogent Technologies Inc. (Acq 2004)
      - Athena Diagnostics (Acq 2006)
    - Thermo Electron
      - Kendro Laboratory Products (Acq 2005)
      - Rupprecht and Patashnick Co., Inc. (Acq 2005)
      - NITON LLC (Acq 2005)
      - InnaPhase Corporation (Acq 2004)
      - US Counseling Services, Inc. (Acq 2004)
      - Jouan SA (Acq 2004)
      - Laboratory Management Systems, Inc. (Acq 2003)
  - Phadia (Acq 2011)
  - Life Technologies (Acq 2013)
    - Invitrogen Corporation (Merged 2008)
      - NOVEX
      - Research Genetics, Inc (Acq 1999)
      - Ethrog Biotechnology
      - Molecular Probes
      - Dynal
      - Panvera
      - InforMax
      - BioSource
      - CellzDirect
      - Zymed
      - Caltag Laboratories
    - Applied Biosystems (Merged 2008)
  - Advanced Scientifics (Acq 2015)
  - Alfa Aesar (Acq 2015)
  - Affymetrix (Acq 2016)
    - Genetic MicroSystems (Acq 1999)
    - Neomorphic (Acq 2000)
    - ParAllele Bioscience
    - USB Corporation (Acq 2008)
    - Panomics (Acq 2008)
    - True Materials (Acq 2000)
    - eBioscience (Acq 2012)
  - Compendia Bioscience (Acq 2012)
  - FEI Company (Acq 2016)
    - FEI Company (Merged 1997)
      - Field Electron and Ion Co. (Est 1971)
      - Philips Electron Optics
    - Micrion (Acq 1999)
  - MTI-GlobalStem (Acq 2016)
  - Finesse Solutions, Inc. (Acq 2017)
  - Core Informatics (Acq 2017)
  - Patheon (Acq 2017)
    - Agere Pharmaceuticals (Acq 2015)
    - Gallus Pharmaceuticals (Acq 2014)
    - Royal DSM NV (Pharmaceutical div, merged 2014)
    - MOVA (Acq 2004)
    - Banner Pharmacaps (Acq 2013)
  - Brammer Bio (Acq 2019)
  - Phitonex, Inc. (Acq 2020)
  - Henogen S.A. (Acq 2021)
  - Mesa Biotech, Inc. (Acq 2021)
  - PPD, Inc. (Acq 2021)
    - Acurian (Acq 2013)
    - Evidera (Acq 2016)
    - Medimix (Acq 2019)
  - PharmaFluidics (Acq 2021)
  - PeproTech (Acq 2021)
  - The Binding Site Group (Acq 2023)
  - CorEvitas, LLC (Acq 2023)
  - Olink Holding (Acq 2023)

== Operations ==
Thermo Fisher Scientific supplies laboratory equipment, reagents, analytical instruments and diagnostic tests, and provides clinical research and pharmaceutical manufacturing services. It reports its activities through four business segments: Life Sciences Solutions, Analytical Instruments, Specialty Diagnostics, and Laboratory Products and Biopharma Services.

The company develops and manufactures electron microscopes at sites in Eindhoven, Netherlands; Hillsboro, Oregon, US; and Brno, Czech Republic. The Brno site also develops and manufactures spectrometers. Its site in Bremen, Germany, develops and manufactures mass spectrometers and analytical systems.

== Leadership ==
Marc N. Casper has been Chief Executive Officer of Thermo Fisher Scientific since October 2009, and was elected Chairman of the Board in February 2020. He also served as President from 2009 until March 2026. He joined the company in 2001 as President of the Life Sciences sector of Thermo Electron. Casper was named Senior Vice President in 2003, and in 2005 assumed responsibility for all of the company’s operating divisions. After the merger creating Thermo Fisher Scientific in 2006, he was named Executive Vice President and President of its Analytical Technologies business, and in 2008 he became the company’s Chief Operating Officer.

Prior to joining Thermo Fisher, Casper served as President, Chief Executive Officer and a Director of Kendro Laboratory Products. Previously, he worked for clinical diagnostics provider Dade Behring Inc., serving as President–Americas. He began his career as a strategy consultant at Bain & Company and later joined Bain Capital.

== Partnerships ==
In September 2017, Thermo Fisher Scientific signed an agreement with the Institute of Pathology Heidelberg (IPH) to establish its Center of Molecular Pathology at Heidelberg University Hospital as the newest member of the Next Generation Sequencing Companion Dx Center of Excellence Program (COEP). The initiative focuses on establishing strategic collaborations with leading, European-based organizations that can lead studies using Thermo Fisher's Oncomine portfolio of research panels destined for development as companion diagnostics to help drive precision oncology in the region.

In 2021, Thermo Fisher announced the construction of a cell therapy development, manufacturing and collaboration center in cooperation with University of California, San Francisco on the school's Mission Bay campus.

In February 2022, Thermo Fisher Scientific announced a 15-year strategic collaboration agreement with Moderna, Inc. The collaboration was designed to scale up the manufacturing of Moderna’s COVID-19 vaccine and other investigational mRNA products.

In May 2023, Thermo Fisher partnered with Pfizer, with plans to work together on expanding testing capabilities for lung and breast cancer patients.

In November 2023, Thermo Fisher partnered with Flagship Pioneering, a biotechnology company. Together, they plan to create companies in the biotechnology field.

In January 2025, Thermo Fisher partnered with the UK Biobank Pharma Proteomics Project (UKB-PPP) to support the world’s largest human proteomics study. Using the Olink Explore platform, UKB-PPP seeks to analyze more than 5,400 proteins from 600,000 samples to fuel the discovery of new protein biomarkers that can be used to predict, diagnose, and treat diseases.

In February 2025, Thermo Fisher entered a 10-year virtual power purchase agreement (VPPA) with X-ELIO to secure 118 megawatts of solar energy, moving its European operations closer to a 100% renewable electricity goal.

In June 2025, Thermo Fisher partnered with the Regeneron Genetics Center which selected the Olink Explore platform for large-scale proteomics investigation involving nearly 200,000 patient samples aiming to unlock new insights into the dynamic biology and mechanisms of human disease.

== Controversies ==
=== Xinjiang and Tibet ===
In February 2019, Thermo Fisher Scientific announced that it would stop selling its equipment in Xinjiang. In June 2020, Thermo Fisher Scientific was reported to sell its equipment to security services in China for use in what was alleged as part of a genetic surveillance program. A report from the Australian Strategic Policy Institute found that Thermo Fisher Scientific collaborated with the Chinese Ministry of Public Security to develop a Huaxia PCR amplification kit specifically to identify the genotypes of Uyghur, Tibetan and Hui ethnic minorities. In June 2021, The New York Times reported that, despite bans, Thermo Fisher Scientific equipment continued to be sold to police in Xinjiang.

In 2022, following reports that Thermo Fisher Scientific had sold products to police in the Tibet Autonomous Region, the Inter-Parliamentary Alliance on China called on governments to "investigate and suspend commercial activities with companies providing the PRC government with technologies to carry out biometric surveillance in the Uyghur Region, Tibet and elsewhere in the PRC, including the PRC state backed BGI Group and US firm Thermo Fisher." Thermo Fisher Scientific subsequently halted sales of DNA collection kits in Tibet.

=== HeLa cells ===
In October 2021 the estate of Henrietta Lacks sued to get past and future payment for the alleged and widely known unauthorized sale by Thermo Fisher Scientific of her HeLa cells which are essential in many types of research. Over 50 million tons of her cells have been produced and used in over 60,000 scientific studies touching virtually every realm of medicine, including the development of polio vaccines, gene mapping, in-vitro fertilization, and multitudes more.

In May 2022, it was announced Thermo Fisher Scientific went to court to seek a dismissal of the lawsuit. In late July 2023, with the motion to dismiss still outstanding, the court ordered the parties to attend a settlement conference. Soon after that, settlement of the suit, with undisclosed terms, was announced.

=== Mexican plant ===
In 2013, Opengate Capital Group LLC filed suit against Thermo Fisher Scientific for selling it a manufacturing plant controlled by the Gulf Cartel. According to Opengate Capital, the company withheld important documents and pressured employees into concealing the presence of the drug cartel.

=== Image manipulation ===
In May 2026, scientists found that a large number of images from Thermo Fisher Scientific's catalog had been manipulated, with sections of the images blanked out and duplicated with the same part of the picture copied into multiple places. The images were claimed to validate the effectiveness of antibody products which have uses including Western blots.
