= Thermo Electron =

Former company for analytical instruments and services

Thermo Electron Corporation
- Founded: 1956; 70 years ago
- Founder: George N. Hatsopoulos; Peter M. Nomikos
- Defunct: November 9, 2006; 19 years ago
- Fate: Merged with Fisher Scientific
- Successor: Thermo Fisher Scientific
- Headquarters: Waltham, Massachusetts, U.S.
- Products: Analytical and scientific products and services
- Number of employees: 37,000

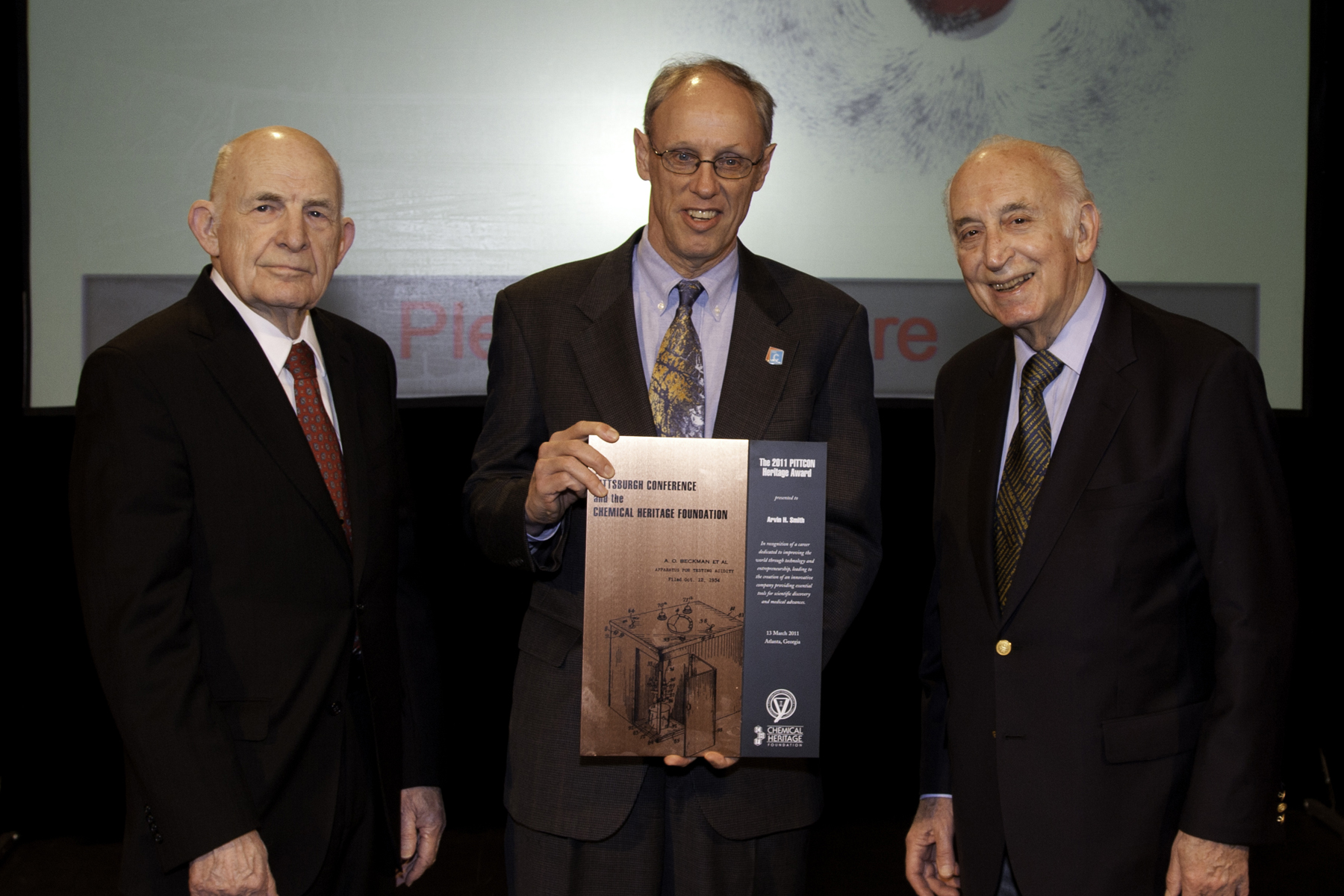
Arvin Smith and George Hatsopoulos receive the 2011 Pittcon Heritage Award from Tom Tritton of the Chemical Heritage Foundation

Thermo Electron Corporation (NYSE: TMO) was a major provider of analytical instruments and services for a variety of domains. It was co-founded in 1956 by George N. Hatsopoulos, an MIT PhD in mechanical engineering, and Peter M. Nomikos, a Harvard Business School graduate, who provided initial funding.

After graduating from Northeastern University in 1959, John Hatsopoulos (brother of George) later joined the company as Financial Controller. Arvin Smith joined the company in 1970, and was President from January 1998.

On May 14, 2006, Thermo and Fisher Scientific announced that they would merge in a tax-free, stock-for-stock exchange. The merged company became Thermo Fisher Scientific. On November 9, 2006, the companies announced that the merger had been completed. However, the Federal Trade Commission ruled that this acquisition was anticompetitive with regard to centrifugal evaporators, requiring Fisher to divest Genevac. In April 2007, Genevac was sold to Riverlake Partners LLC and the merger closed with FTC approval.

In 2011, the aggregated company Thermo Fisher Scientific had revenues of over $11 billion, and employed 37,000 people.

== Products ==
- Zetatron, a high-voltage neutron generating vacuum tube
