= Newcomb Cleveland Prize =

American award for outstanding scientific papers

The Newcomb Cleveland Prize of the American Association for the Advancement of Science (AAAS) is annually awarded to author(s) of outstanding scientific paper published in the Research Articles or Reports sections of Science. Established in 1923, funded by Newcomb Cleveland who remained anonymous until his death in 1951, and for this period it was known as the AAAS Thousand Dollar Prize. "The prize was inspired by Mr. Cleveland's belief that it was the scientist who counted and who needed the encouragement an unexpected monetary award could give." The present rules were instituted in 1975, previously it had gone to the author(s) of noteworthy papers, representing an outstanding contribution to science, presented in a regular session, sectional or societal, during the AAAS Annual Meeting. It is now sponsored by the Fodor Family Trust and includes a prize of $25,000.

The prize's current sponsorship has a notable connection to a past winner: Stephen P. A. Fodor, founder of Affymetrix, received the prize in 1990 for a paper introducing microarray technology. Affymetrix added its support to the prize in 2003, more than doubling its monetary value at the time. Winners receive a bronze medal, a share of the prize money, and reimbursement for travel to the AAAS Annual Meeting. Final selection is determined by a panel of distinguished scientists appointed by the editor-in-chief of Science. The annual contest period runs from the first issue of June through the last issue of the following May. No prize was awarded in 1942–1945, 1948, 1973, 1975, or 1976.

== Recipients ==
List of winners:

=== Current rules ===
Year	Authors	Title
2023	Simon C. Stähler et al.	Seismic Detection of the Martian Core
2022	Timo H. J. Niedermeyer, Susan B. Wilde et al.	Hunting the eagle killer: A cyanobacterial neurotoxin causes vacuolar myelinopathy
2021	K. W. Bannister, A. T. Deller, C. Phillips, J.-P. Macquart, J. X. Prochaska, N. Tejos, S. D. Ryder, E. M. Sadler, R. M. Shannon, S. Simha, C. K. Day, M. McQuinn, F. O. North-Hickey, S. Bhandari, W. R. Arcus, V. N. Bennert, J. Burchett, M. Bouwhuis, R. Dodson, R. D. Ekers, W. Farah, C. Flynn, C. W. James, M. Kerr, E. Lenc, E. K. Mahony, J. O’Meara, S. Osłowski, H. Qiu1, T. Treu, V. U, T. J. Bateman, D. C.-J. Bock, R. J. Bolton, A. Brown, J. D. Bunton, A. P. Chippendale, F. R. Cooray, T. Cornwell, N. Gupta, D. B. Hayman, M. Kesteven, B. S. Koribalski, A. MacLeod, N. M. McClure-Griffiths, S. Neuhold, R. P. Norris, M. A. Pilawa, R.-Y. Qiao, J. Reynolds, D. N. Roxby, T. W. Shimwell, M. A. Voronkov, C. D. Wilson	A single fast radio burst localized to a massive galaxy at cosmological distance
2019	Brian Lovett, Etienne Bilgo, Souro Abel Millogo, Abel Kader Ouattarra, Issiaka Sare, Edounou Jacques Gnambani, Roch K. Dabire, Abdoulaye Diabate, Raymond St. Leger	Transgenic Metarhizium rapidly kills mosquitoes in a malaria-endemic region of Burkina Faso
2018	Juan Yin, Yuan Cao, Yu-Huai Li, Sheng-Kai Liao, Liang Zhang, Ji-Gang Ren, Wen-Qi Cai, Wei-Yue Liu, Bo Li, Hui Dai, Guang-Bing Li, Qi-Ming Lu, Yun-Hong Gong, Yu Xu, Shuang-Lin Li, Feng-Zhi Li, Ya-Yun Yin, Zi-Qing Jiang, Ming Li, Jian-Jun Jia, Ge Ren, Dong He, Yi-Lin Zhou, Xiao-Xiang Zhang, Na Wang, Xiang Chang, Zhen-Cai Zhu, Nai-Le Liu, Yu-Ao Chen, Chao-Yang Lu, Rong Shu, Cheng-Zhi Peng, Jian-Yu Wang, Jian-Wei Pan	Satellite-based entanglement distribution over 1200 kilometers
2017	James M. Eagan, Jun Xu, Rocco Di Girolamo, Christopher M. Thurber, Christopher Macosko, Anne M. LaPointe, Frank S. Bates, Geoffrey W. Coates	Combining polyethylene and polypropylene: Enhanced performance with PE/iPP multiblock polymers
2016	Robert Gütig	Spiking neurons can discover predictive features by aggregate-label learning
2015	Bi-Chang Chen, Wesley R. Legant, Kai Wang, Lin Shao, Daniel E. Milkie, Michael W. Davidson, Chris Janetopoulos, Xufeng S. Wu, John A. Hammer III, Zhe Liu, Brian P. English, Yuko Mimori-Kiyosue, Daniel P. Romero, Alex T. Ritter, Jennifer Lippincott-Schwartz, Lillian Fritz-Laylin, R. Dyche Mullins, Diana M. Mitchell, Joshua N. Bembenek, Anne-Cecile Reymann, Ralph Böhme, Stephan W. Grill, Jennifer T. Wang, Geraldine Seydoux, U. Serdar Tulu, Daniel P. Kiehart, Eric Betzig	Lattice light-sheet microscopy: Imaging molecules to embryos at high spatiotemporal resolution
2014	Lulu Xie, Hogyi Kang, Qiwu Xu, Michael J. Chen, Yonghong Liao, Meenakshisundaram Thiyagarajan, John O’Donnell, Daniel J. Christensen, Charles Nicholson, Jeffrey J. Iliff, Takahiro Takano, Rashid Deane, Maiken Nedergaard	Sleep Drives Metabolite Clearance from the Adult Brain
2013	Travis A. Jarrell, Yi Wang, Adam E. Bloniarz, Christopher A. Brittin, Meng Xu, J. Nichol Thomson, Donna G. Albertson, David H. Hall, and Scott W. Emmons	The Connectome of a Decision-Making Neural Network
2012	Vincent Mourik, Kun Zuo, Sergey M. Frolov, Sébastien R. Plissard, Erik P. A. M. Bakkers, and Leo P. Kouwenhoven	Signatures of Majorana Fermions in Hybrid Superconductor-Semiconductor Nanowire Devices
2011	Waseem S. Bakr, Amy Peng, M. Eric Tai, Ruichao Ma, Jonathan Simon, Jonathon Isaiah Gillen, Simon Fölling, Lode Pollet, and Markus Greiner	Probing the Superfluid-to-Mott Insulator Transition at the Single-Atom Level
2010	Richard E. Green, Johannes Krause, Adrian W. Briggs, Tomislav Maricic, Udo Stenzel, Martin Kircher, Nick Patterson, Heng Li, Weiwei Zhai, Markus Hsi-Yang Fritz, Nancy F. Hansen, Eric Y. Durand, Anna-Sapfo Malaspinas, Jeffrey D. Jensen, Tomas Marques-Bonet, Can Alkan, Kay Prüfer, Matthias Meyer, Hernán A. Burbano, Jeffrey M. Good, Rigo Schultz, Ayinuer Aximu-Petri, Anne Butthof, Barbara Höber, Barbara Höffner, Madlen Siegemund, Antje Weihmann, Chad Nusbaum, Eric S. Lander, Carsten Russ, Nathaniel Novod, Jason Affourtit, Michael Egholm, Christine Verna, Pavao Rudan, Dejana Brajkovic, Željko Kucan, Ivan Gušic, Vladimir B. Doronichev, Liubov V. Golovanova, Carles Lalueza-Fox, Marco de la Rasilla, Javier Fortea, Antonio Rosas, Ralf W. Schmitz, Philip L. F. Johnson, Evan E. Eichler, Daniel Falush, Ewan Birney, James C. Mullikin, Montgomery Slatkin, Rasmus Nielsen, Janet Kelso, Michael Lachmann, David Reich, and Svante Pääbo	A Draft Sequence of the Neandertal Genome
2009	Paul Kalas, James R. Graham, Eugene Chiang, Michael P. Fitzgerald, Mark Clampin, Edwin S. Kite, Karl Stapelfeldt, Christian Marois, and John Krist	Optical Images of an Exosolar Planet 25 Light-Years from Earth
2009	Christian Marois, Bruce Macintosh, Travis Barman, Benjamin Zuckerman, Inseok Song, Jennifer Patience, David Lafrenière, and René Doyon	Direct Imaging of Multiple Planets Orbiting the Star HR 8799
2008	Anoop Kumar, James W. Godwin, Phillip B. Gates, A. Acely Garza-Garcia, and Jeremy P. Brockes	Molecular Basis for the Nerve Dependence of Limb Regeneration in an Adult Vertebrate
2007	Hani M. El-Kaderi, Joseph R. Hunt, Jose L. Mendoza-Cortes, Adrien P. Côté, Robert E. Taylor, Michael O’Keeffe, and Omar M. Yaghi	Designed Synthesis of 3D Covalent Organic Frameworks
2006	Jason R. Petta, Alexander C. Johnson, Jacob M. Taylor, Edward A. Laird, Amir Yacoby, Mikhail D. Lukin, Charles M. Marcus, Micah P. Hanson, Arthur C. Gossard	Coherent Manipulation of Coupled Electron Spins in Semiconductor Quantum Dots
2005	Yuichiro K. Kato, Roberto C. Myers, Arthur C. Gossard, and David D. Awschalom	Observation of the Spin Hall Effect in Semiconductors
2004	Brian Kuhlman, Gautam Dantas, Gregory C. Ireton, Gabriele Varani, Barry L. Stoddard and David Baker	Design of a Novel Globular Protein Fold with Atomic-Level Accuracy
2003	Thomas A. Volpe, Catherine Kidner, Ira M. Hall, Grace Teng, Shiv I.S. Grewal and Robert A. Martienssen	Regulation of Heterochromatic Silencing and Histone H3 Lysine-9 Methylation by RNAi
2003	Ira M. Hall, Gurumurthy D. Shankaranarayana, Ken-ichi Noma, Nabieh Ayoub, Amikam Cohen and Shiv I.S. Grewal	Establishment and Maintenance of a Heterochromatin Domain
2002	Mariana Lagos-Quintana, Reinhard Rauhut, Winfried Lendeckel, and Thomas Tuschl	Identification of Novel Genes Coding for Small Expressed RNAs
2002	Nelson C. Lau, Lee P. Lim, Earl G. Weinstein, and David P. Bartel	An Abundant Class of Tiny RNAs with Probable Regulatory Roles in Caenorhabditis elegans
2002	Rosalind C. Lee and Victor Ambros	An Extensive Class of Small RNAs in Caenorhabditis elegans
2001	Nenad Ban, Poul Nissen, Jeffrey Hansen, Peter B. Moore, and Thomas A. Steitz	The Complete Atomic Structure of the Large Ribosomal Subunit at 2.4 Å Resolution
2001	Poul Nissen, Jeffrey Hansen, Nenad Ban, Peter B. Moore, and Thomas A. Steitz	The Structural Basis for Ribosome Activity in Peptide Bond Synthesis
2001	Marat M. Yusupov, Gulnara Gh. Yusupova, Albion Baucom, Kate Lieberman, Thomas N. Earnest, J.H.D. Cate, and Harry F. Noller	Crystal Structure of the Ribosome at 5.5 Å Resolution
1999	Mark D. Adams, Susan Celniker, Gerald M. Rubin and J. Craig Venter	The Genome Sequence of Drosophila melanogaster
1998	Norman Murray and Matthew Holman	The Origin of Chaos in the Outer Solar System
1997	Declan A. Doyle, João Morais Cabral, Richard A. Pfuetzner, Anling Kuo, Jacqueline M. Gulbis, Steven L. Cohen, Brian T. Chait and Roderick MacKinnon	The Structure of the Potassium Channel: Molecular Basis of K+ Conduction and Selectivity
1997	Roderick MacKinnon, Steven L. Cohen, Anling Kuo, Alice Lee and Brian T. Chait	Structural Conservation in Prokaryotic and Eukaryotic Potassium Channels
1996	Nicholas C. Wrighton, Francis X. Farrell, Ray Chang, Arun K. Kashyap, Francis Barbone, Linda S. Mulcahy, Dana L. Johnson, Ronald W. Barrett, Linda K. Jolliffe and William J. Dower	Small peptides as Potent Mimetics of the Protein Hormone Erythropoietin
1996	Oded Livnah, Enrico A. Stura, Dana L. Johnson, Steven A. Middleton, Linda S. Mulcahy, Nicholas C. Wrighton, William J. Dower, Linda K. Jolliffe and Ian A. Wilson	Functional Mimicry of a Protein Hormone by a Peptide Agonist: The EPO receptor Complex at 2.8 Å
1996	Yu Feng, Christopher C. Broder, Paul E. Kennedy, and Edward A. Berger	HIV-1 Entry Cofactor: Functional cDNA Cloning of a Seven-Transmembrane, G Protein-Coupled Receptor
1995	Michael H. Anderson, Jason R. Ensher, Michael R. Matthews, Carl E. Wieman, and Eric A. Cornell	Observation of Bose-Einstein Condensation in a Dilute Atomic Vapor
1994	Georg Halder, Patrick Callaerts and Walter J. Gehring	Induction of Ectopic Eyes by Targeted Expression of the eyeless Gene in Drosophila
1993	Jerome Faist, Federico Capasso, Deborah L. Sivco, Carlo Sitori, Albert L. Hutchinson, and Alfred Y. Cho	Quantum Cascade Laser
1993	Michael F. Crommie, Christopher P. Lutz, and Donald M. Eigler	Confinement of Electrons to Quantum Corrals on a Metal Surface
1992	Michael J. Mahan, James M. Slauch and John J. Mekalanos	Selection of Bacterial Virulence Genes That Are Specifically Induced in Host Tissues
1991	Paul D. Quay, Bronte Tilbrook and C.S. Wong	Oceanic Uptake of Fossile Fuel CO2; Carbon-13 Evidence
1990	Stephen P. A. Fodor, J. Leighton Read, Michael C. Pirrung, Lubert Stryer, Amy Tsai Lu, and Dennis Solas	Light-Directed, Spatially Addressable Parallel Chemical Synthesis
1989	Margaret J. Geller, John P. Huchra	Mapping the Universe
1988	William H. Landschulz, Peter F. Johnson and Steven L. McKnight	The Leucine Zipper: A Hypothetical Structure Common to a New Class of DNA Binding Proteins The DNA Binding Domain of the Rat Liver Nuclear Protein C/EBP Is Bipartite
1987	Margaret A. Tolbert, Michel J. Rossi, Ripudaman Malhotra, and David M. Golden	Reaction of Chlorine Nitrate with Hydrogen Chloride and Water at Antarctic Stratospheric Temperatures
1987	Mario Molina, Tai-Ly Tso, Luisa T. Molina, and Frank C. Y. Wang	Antarctic Stratospheric Chemistry of Chlorine Nitrate, Hydrogen Chloride, and Ice: Release of Active Chlorine
1986	Arthur J. Zaug, Thomas R. Cech	The Intervening Sequence RNA of Tetrahymena Is an Enzyme
1986	Jeremy Nathans, David S. Hogness, Darcy Thomas, Thomas P. Piantanida, Roger L. Eddy, and Thomas B. Shows	Molecular genetics of human color vision: the genes encoding blue, green, and red pigments Molecular genetics of inherited variation in human color vision
1985	James M. Hogle, Marie Chow and David J. Filman	Three-Dimensional Structure of Poliovirus at 2.9 Å Resolution
1984	Sally M. Rigden, Thomas J. Ahrens and Edward M. Stolper	Densities of Liquid Silicates at High Pressures
1983	Allan C. Spradling and Gerald M. Rubin	Transportation of Cloned P Elements into Drosophila Germ Line Chromosomes Genetic Transformation of Drosophila with Transposable Element Vectors
1982	Dennis G. Kleid, Douglas M. Moore, Howard L. Bachrach, Donald Bowbenko, Marvin J. Grubman, Peter D. McKercher, Donald O. Morgan, Betty H. Robertson, Barbara Small, and Daniel Yansura	Cloned Viral Protein Vaccine for Foot-and-Mouth Disease: Responses in Cattle and Swine
1981	Robert Axelrod and William D. Hamilton	The Evolution of Cooperation
1980	F. N. Spiess, Kenneth C. Macdonald and twenty co-authors	East Pacific Rise: Hot Springs and Geophysical Experiments
1979	Stanton J. Peale, Patrick M. Cassen and Ray T. Reynolds	Melting of Io by Tidal Dissipation
1978	Eric I. Knudsen, Masakazu Konishi and John D. Pettigrew	Receptive Fields of Auditory Neurons in the Owl A Neural Map of Auditory Space in the Owl
1977	Viking Mission scientists	for research reports in Science 27 August, 1 October, and 17 December 1976

=== Previous rules ===
Year	Recipient	Title
1974	Amos Nur	Origin of Velocity Changes before Earthquakes: The Dilatancy Diffusion Hypothesis and Its Confirmation
1972	Bruce Carlson	Morphogenetic Interactions between Skin and Underlying Tissues during Limb Regeneration
1971	Alan Gelperin	Neural Control Systems of Underlying Insect Feeding Behavior
1970	James W. Truman	The Eclosion Hormone: Its Release by the Brain and Its Action on the Central Nervous Systems of Silkmoths
1969	Cornelia P. Channing	Control of Luteinization in Granulosa Cell Cultures
1968	Joel L. Rosenbaum	Control of Protein Synthesis in Flagellar Growth
1967	Edward O. Wilson	Recent Advances in Chemical Communication
1967	Thomas Eisner	Cross-Specific Chemical Communication
1966	Michael K. Reedy	Cross Bridges and Periods in Insect Flight Muscle
1965	David S. Hogness	The Structure and Function of the DNA from Bacteriophage Lambda
1964	John Papaconstantinou	Protein and Nucleic Acid Changes in the Differentiation of Lens Cells
1963	Jonathan W. Uhr	The Heterogeneity of the Immune Response
1962	J. F. Evernden and G. H. Curtis	The Dating of Early Man and His Cultures by the Potassium-Argon Method
1961	Richard D. Alexander	The Role of Behavioral Study in Cricket Classification
1960	Halton C. Arp	The Stellar Content of Galaxies
1959	Edward Anders	Meteorites and Asteroids
1958	Jerzy Neyman and Elizabeth L. Scott	On Certain Stochastic Models of Population Dynamical Phenomena
1957	Martin Schwarzschild, J. B. Rogerson, Jr. and J. W. Evans	Solar Photographs from 80,000 Feet
1956	Neal E. Miller	Learning and Performance Motivated by Direct Stimulation of the Brain
1956	James Olds	Effects of Hunger, Sex, and Tranquilizers on Localized Reward Systems in the Brain
1955	Seymour S. Cohen	Molecular Bases of the Parasitism of Some Bacterial Viruses
1954	Daniel H. Alpert	Experiments at Very Low Pressures
1953	Barry Commoner	Studies on the Biosynthesis of Tobacco Mosaic Virus
1952	A. M. Gleason	Natural Coordinate Systems
1951	J. Laurence Kulp	Natural Radiocarbon Measurements
1950	Carroll M. Williams	for several papers on the enzymes, hormones, and development of Cecropia silkworms
1949	Armin C. Braun	Thermal Inactivation Study on the Tumor-inducing Principle in Crown Gall
1947	Harrison S. Brown	Elements in Meteorites and the Earth's Origin
1946	T. M. Sonneborn, Ruth V. Dippel and Winifred Jacobson	for several papers on the mechanism of heredity in Paramecium
1946	Quentin M. Geiman and Ralph W. McKee	Cultural Studies on the Nutrition of Malarial Parasites
1941	Dugald E. S. Brown, Douglas A. Marsland and Frank H. Johnson	for two papers on a basic mechanism in the biological effects of temperature, hydrostatic pressure, and narcosis
1940	Dennis R. Hoagland and Daniel I. Arnon	Availability of Nutrients with Special Reference to Physiological Aspects
1939	I. I. Rabi	Radio Frequency Spectra of Atoms and Molecules
1938	Norman R. F. Maier	Experimentally Produced Neurotic Behavior in the Rat
1937	Philip R. White	Root Pressure: An Unappreciated Force in Sap Movement
1936	Wendell M. Stanley	Chemical Studies of the Virus of Tobacco Mosaic
1935	P. W. Zimmerman and A. E. Hitchcock	The Initiation and Growth of Secondary Roots Induced by Growth Substances
1934	Vern O. Knudsen	The Absorption of Sound in Gases
1933	Reuben L. Kahn	Tissue Reactions in Immunity
1932	Henry Eyring	Quantum Mechanics of Conjugate Double Bonds
1931	Carl Caskey Speidel	Studies of Living Nerves II. Activities of Amoeboid Growth Cones, Sheath Cells and Myelin Segments, as Revealed by Prolonged Observation of Individual Fibers in Frog Tadpoles
1930	M. A. Tuve, L. R. Hafstad and O. Dahl	Experiments with High Voltage Tubes
1929	Arthur J. Dempster	For his work on the reflection of protons from a calcite crystal
1928	Oliver Kamm	Hormones from the Pituitary Gland
1927	H. J. Muller	Effects of X-Radiation on Genes and Chromosomes
1926	George David Birkhoff	A Mathematical Critique of Some Physical Theories
1925	Dayton C. Miller	The Michelson-Morley Ether Drift Experiment, its History and Significance
1924	Edwin P. Hubble	Cepheids in Spiral Nebulae
1924	L. R. Cleveland	For two papers on the symbiosis between termites and their intestinal protozoa
1923	Leonard Eugene Dickson	On the Theory of Numbers and Generalized Quaternions

== See also ==
- AAAS Award for Science Diplomacy
- AAAS Award for Scientific Freedom and Responsibility
- AAAS Philip Hauge Abelson Prize
- AAAS Prize for Behavioral Science Research
