= AmpliChip =

Series of genetic tests from Rochr

AmpliChip is a family of clinical tests from the Swiss healthcare company Hoffmann-La Roche which aims to find out the patients' genotype using micro-array technology from Affymetrix (Genechip). The tests include the CYP450 Test and the P53 Test. The CYP450 Test was approved by the U.S. Food and Drug Administration.
