= AmpliChip CYP450 Test =

Clinical genetic test from Roche

AmpliChip CYP450 Test is a clinical test from Roche and part of the AmpliChip series. The test aims to find the specific gene types ( genotypes) of the patient that will determine how he or she metabolizes certain medicines, and therefore guides the doctors to prescribe the medicine suited for the best effectiveness and least side effects.

The AmpliChip CYP450 Test uses micro array technology from Affymetrix (GeneChip) to determine the genotype of the patient in terms of two cytochrome P450 enzymes: 2D6 and 2C19.

== 2D6 and 2C19 variability ==
CYP2D6 and CYP2C19 belong to the Cytochrome P450 oxidase family. CYP2D6 has over 90 variants, 2C19 has mainly three. They are responsible for the majority of the inter-individual variability in the ability to metabolize drugs.

There are four phenotypes of CYP2D6: Poor Metabolizer (PM), Intermediate Metabolizer (IM), Extensive (normal) Metabolizer (EM) and Ultrarapid Metabolizer (UM). For CYP2C19, there are only two phenotypes: PM and EM. If a substrate of the enzyme is given to the patient as a medication, and if the patient has reduced CYP2D6 or CYP2C19 activity, the patient will have elevated drug concentration in their body, and therefore severe side effects may occur. On the other hand, for the UM patient, the drug concentration might be too low to have a therapeutic effect. Thus testing the phenotype of the patient is important to help determine the optimum dosage of the drug.

== How it works ==
The test analyzes the DNA of a patient to determine the genotype, after which predictions of the phenotype can then be made. The DNA sample comes from blood tests (as Roche suggests) or, alternatively, comes from a mouth brush called a buccal swab. The analysis has five steps after DNA is extracted from patient samples:

1. PCR amplification of the gene.
2. Fragmentation and labeling of the PCR product
3. Hybridization and staining on the AmpliChip DNA microarray.
4. Scanning the chip.
5. Data analysis.

== FDA approval ==
The USFDA approved the test on December 24, 2004. The AmpliChip CYP450 test is the first FDA approved pharmacogenetic test.

== Applications ==
Since a lot of the CYP2D6 substrates are psychiatric drugs (antidepressant and antipsychotics, for example), the AmpliChip CYP450 has been extensively used in psychiatry.

== Criticism ==
The main criticism of the test is that the test finds out the genotype (the makeup of the gene types) of the patient, which does not necessarily cover all the phenotypes (the actual biological effect). For example, some argue that the so-called ultra-rapid metaboliser, who has extra copies of the 2D6 gene expressed, cannot be reliably tested.

Also, the test does not cover some rarer genotypes, nor genotypes that have not yet been discovered.

Also, insurance companies still do not cover the price of the test, which can cost $600–$1300 to the patient, because the test is "experimental, investigational or unproven".
