= Stephen Fodor =

American biologist

Stephen P. A. "Steve" Fodor (born in Seattle, Washington in 1953) is a scientist and businessman in the field of DNA microarray technology.

He is the co-founder of Affymetrix, a company that produces DNA microarrays to screen gene expression and genetic variations in large portions of such genomes as human, rat, and mouse, which is currently widely used in research, and could be used to screen patients for diseases.

He was awarded the Association of Biomolecular Resource Facilities Award for outstanding contributions to Biomolecular Technologies in 2005 and the European Inventor of the Year Award in 2006. He was elected to the National Academy of Engineering in 2009. Awarded the Newcomb Cleveland Prize in 1990.

Fodor is a member of the Board of Trustees Carnegie Institution for Science.

== Education ==
Fodor received a BS and MS in Biology from Washington State University. He received a PhD in chemistry from Princeton in 1985.
