= Jason Petta =

American physicist (born 1975)

Jason Robert Petta (born 1975) is a physics researcher, professor, and noted contributor to developments in quantum computing. He is a professor at UCLA, and was formerly Eugene Higgins Professor of Physics at Princeton University.

Petta was born in 1975 in Freeport, Illinois. After graduating from Freeport High School, he attended technical school and worked in construction for two years before enrolling in the University of Illinois Urbana-Champaign. He received a B.S. degree in engineering physics from that university, as well as both an M.S. and a Ph.D. in physics from Cornell University. His thesis title was Effects of spin-orbit coupling on single quantum states in metallic quantum dots, completed in 2003 under the advisor Daniel Ralph.

After graduating Cornell with his Ph.D., Petta worked as a postdoctoral fellow in Charlie Marcus's research group at Harvard University, participating in experiments trapping and detecting singular electrons and controlling spin states with two electrons. Petta left Harvard and started a position at Caltech in 2006, before joining Princeton University in 2007.

In 2008, Petta won a Packard Fellowship for Science and Engineering. He also won a National Science Foundation CAREER Award in 2009 and a Presidential Early Career Award for Scientists and Engineers in 2010. Also in 2010, Petta, then an assistant professor at Princeton, described a discovery in quantum computing: when applying voltage to electrodes, electrons can be formed into "spin qubits", a quantum version of a bit. This was touted as a milestone in physics by Princeton, and experts such as David DiVincenzo commended the discovery. In 2015, Petta spearheaded the development of a microwave laser composed of multiple quantum dots for use in quantum computing. Other research at Princeton included quantum coherence control within nanostructures of semiconductors.

Petta was named Eugene Higgins Professor of Physics, an endowed professorship, in 2019. As of 2024, he works as both a research director at HRL Laboratories and a professor of physics at UCLA. At UCLA, he is a faculty member in the Department of Physics & Astronomy, works for the Center for Quantum Science and Engineering, and moved into his eponymous Petta Lab in May 2023.

Petta is a fellow of the American Physical Society, fellow of the American Association for the Advancement of Science, and winner of the association's Newcomb Cleveland Prize.
