= Richard E. Green =

American computational biologist

- Education: University of Georgia (BS); University of California, Berkeley (PhD)
- Known for: Neanderthal genome project
- Spouse: Beth Shapiro
- Scientific career
- Fields: Computational biology, paleogenomics
- Workplaces: University of California, Santa Cruz
- Doctoral advisor: Steven Brenner
- Other academic advisors: Svante Pääbo (postdoctoral)

Richard E. Green (born 1972) is an American computational biologist and paleogenomicist. He is a professor of biomolecular engineering at the University of California, Santa Cruz. He is known for his contributions to ancient DNA research, including as a lead author of the Neanderthal genome project.

== Education and early career ==
Green was born in 1972 in Atlanta, Georgia.

He received a B.S. in genetics from the University of Georgia in 1997. Early in his career, he served in the Peace Corps. He also worked as a laboratory technician at Emory University prior to beginning his doctoral studies.

Green completed a Ph.D. at the University of California, Berkeley in 2005 under Steven Brenner.

He conducted postdoctoral research as an NSF fellow at the Max Planck Institute for Evolutionary Anthropology in the laboratory of Svante Pääbo, who was later awarded the 2022 Nobel Prize in Physiology or Medicine for work on ancient DNA and human evolution.

Green joined the faculty at the University of California, Santa Cruz, where he is a professor of biomolecular engineering.

== Research ==
Green is best known as a lead author of the Neanderthal genome project. In 2010, he and colleagues published a draft sequence of the Neanderthal genome in Science.

The study provided evidence that modern humans outside Africa carry Neanderthal DNA, suggesting interbreeding between the two groups.

His later work has examined the contribution of Neanderthal and Denisovan DNA to modern human populations.

== Entrepreneurship ==
Green has co-founded biotechnology companies focused on genomic technologies, including Dovetail Genomics, Claret Biosciences, and Astrea Forensics.

== Forensic genomics ==
Green has been involved in applying genomic sequencing methods developed for ancient DNA research to forensic science, including the analysis of degraded DNA samples such as rootless hair.

In the Gilgo Beach serial killings case, courts evaluated the admissibility of DNA evidence derived from degraded hair using whole-genome sequencing methods. A New York judge ruled that such evidence could be admitted at trial, a decision described as potentially setting a precedent for the use of next-generation sequencing in U.S. courts.

== Awards and honors ==
Green has received several honors for his contributions to genomics, including the Newcomb Cleveland Prize, Sloan Research Fellowship, and Searle Scholarship.

== Personal life ==
Green is married to evolutionary biologist Beth Shapiro.
