= Bernard G. Amend =

German pharmacist (1821–1911)

- Born: January 1, 1821; Germany
- Died: April 6, 1911 (aged 90)
- Education: University of Giessen
- Known for: establishment of the American Chemical Society; mineral collection
- Spouse: Bertha Schenk
- Scientific career
- Fields: Pharmacology

Bernard G. Amend (1 January 1821 – 6 April 1911) was a German-born pharmacist. He ran an important pharmacy and scientific supply business in New York City that was sold to Fisher Scientific in 1940. He is also known for contributing to the founding of the American Chemical Society and for his mineralogy collection.

== Biography ==
He emigrated to the United States in 1848 and took a position as chemist in a small pharmacy, which was then located at the corner of 18th Street and Third Avenue in New York, just north of the neighborhood called Little Germany. The owner retired in 1851, and Amend took over the business. With old college friend, Carl (Charles) Eimer, he renamed the company "Eimer & Amend" and soon the company became the country's leading importer of drugs and chemicals. In 1874 they added laboratory supplies to their inventory.

In 1886 Amend built a new seven-story brick building in the location of the prior business, called the Eimer & Amend building. He was a member of the New York Mineralogical Club.

== Awards and honours ==
He was a member of The Association for the Protection of the Adirondacks, the Metropolitan Museum of Art, and the American Museum of Natural History.
