= Phadia =

Medical products company

- Company type: Subsidiary
- Industry: Pharmaceutical
- Founded: Uppsala (1971)
- Headquarters: Uppsala, Sweden
- Area served: Worldwide
- Key people: Bronwyn Brophy (CEO)
- Products: ImmunoCAP
- Number of employees: 1,700 (2010)
- Parent: Thermo Fisher Scientific
- Website: Phadia.com

Phadia develops, manufactures and markets blood test systems to support the clinical diagnosis and monitoring of allergy, asthma and autoimmune diseases. The company is headquartered in Uppsala, Sweden. It has been owned by Thermo Fisher Scientific since 2011.

== History ==
Originally part of the Pharmacia group of companies and an offshoot of the diagnostics division that developed out of Pfizer and Pharmacia & Upjohn (all Uppsala-based companies), Phadia was renamed in January 2006.

The first steps towards the present Phadia AB were taken in the mid 1960s. Three scientists working at Uppsala University Hospital, Leif Wide, Rolf Axén and Jerker Porath, then presented their ideas to use Pharmacia's separation medium Sephadex as the solid phase in immunodiagnostics tests and proposed a collaboration with the company for the commercial development. Pharmacia's management decided to go for the project and established a special R&D group for diagnostics products. In 1970 Pharmacia's first product, Phadebas Amylase Test, a test for the enzyme alpha-amylase, was launched.

At the same time an important medical discovery was made which would be of decisive importance to Phadia. In 1967 immunoglobulin E, or IgE, was discovered by two separate research teams, by Teruko and Kimishige Ishizaka in the US and by Gunnar Johansson and Hans Bennich at Uppsala University Hospital. Johansson and Bennich worked together with Wide to develop a method to measure the levels of the substance in blood samples. Eventually a clear connection was demonstrated between IgE antibodies and allergic symptoms. Johansson, Bennich and Wide then suggested that Pharmacia should use the findings to develop a commercial allergy test. This led to the ground-breaking product Phadebas RAST, which established the leading position that Phadia still maintains in the area of allergy testing.

== Immunoglobulin E testing ==
Since the discovery of IgE in 1967, Phadia has pioneered the development of in vitro test systems for allergy (immunoglobulin E). These IgE tests have been followed by tests for IgG and IgA antibodies, as well as other analytes with applications in asthma, celiac disease and autoimmunity.

In addition, the ImmunoCAP testing system has revolutionized the level of automation and speed which these tests are processed. Based on the high binding capacity and solid phase technology, ImmunoCAP tests are both highly sensitive and highly specific.

== See also ==
- Eczema
- Rhinitis
- Asthma
- Thyroid disease
- Diabetes
- Rheumatoid arthritis
- Systemic lupus erythematosus (SLE)
