= Lancaster Laboratories =

Lancaster Laboratories Inc.
- Industry: Contract Analytical Services
- Founded: 1961
- Founder: Earl H. Hess
- Headquarters: Lancaster, Pennsylvania, United States
- Number of locations: 2
- Area served: Worldwide
- Services: Biopharmaceutical; Environmental Sciences; Pharmaceutical
- Revenue: $115 million
- Number of employees: 45,000
- Parent: Eurofins
- Website: http://lancasterlabs.com/

Lancaster Laboratories Inc., is one of the largest contract laboratories in the United States. They specialize in pharmaceutical and environmental analytical services.

Headquartered near Lancaster, Pennsylvania, the company employs 45,000 employees worldwide. Their clients include businesses, industries, and consultants in more than 40 countries, including 19 of the 20 largest pharmaceutical companies in the world.

== History ==
Lancaster Laboratories was founded by Dr. Earl H. Hess in 1961 as a 2,500-square-foot (230 m^{2}) lab with three employees, including the first lab tech, John Snyder. Earl Hess opened the company intending to provide analytical services to area agribusinesses and industries.

The company claims several distinctions:

- They were the first laboratory accredited by the American Association for Laboratory Accreditation
- They prepared the first qualifications manual in the lab industry and implemented a total quality management system in 1989
- They pioneered computerized Laboratory Information Management Systems in the 1970s and designed a model automated system for retrieval and storage of samples — the only laboratory to have such a system

Dr. Hess retired in 1995, selling Lancaster Laboratories to Thermo TerraTech. The company was again sold in 2000 to Goldner Hawn Johnson & Morrison and yet again in August 2005 to Fisher Scientific. Fisher Scientific was acquired by Thermo Electron in 2007 to form Thermo Fisher Scientific. Eurofins Scientific acquired the company in 2011.

Dr. J. Wilson Hershey serves as chairman of the board. Tim S. Oostdyk serves as president.
