= Jeremy Brockes =

British biochemist (born 1948)

- Born: Jeremy Patrick Brockes; 29 February 1948 (age 78); Haslemere, Surrey, England
- Relatives: Emma Brockes (niece)

Academic background
- Education: University of Cambridge (BA); University of Edinburgh (PhD)

Academic work
- Discipline: Biochemistry
- Institutions: University College London; Harvard Medical School; California Institute of Technology; King's College London

Jeremy Patrick Brockes FRS (born 29 February 1948) is a British biochemist who worked as an MRC Research Professor at University College London until 2016.

== Early life and education ==
Brockes was born in Haslemere, Surrey. He attended Winchester College, and then earned a Bachelor of Arts from the University of Cambridge (1969) and a PhD in molecular biology from the University of Edinburgh (1972), where he studied in the laboratory of the late Kenneth Murray and Noreen Murray. He did post-doctoral research at Harvard Medical School with Zach Hall, and at University College London with Martin Raff.

== Career ==
After completing post-doctoral studies, Brockes conducted research and teaching at California Institute of Technology, King's College London and University College London. He investigated cellular interactions in the mammalian peripheral nervous system, and the mechanisms underlying limb regeneration in salamanders. His work on the PNS yielded a method for purification and culture of rodent Schwann cells. This led to the identification of Glial Growth Factor, an early member of the Neuregulin family of growth factors that are key regulators in tissues such as heart and brain, as well as the PNS. His work on limb regeneration included studies on dedifferentiation, nerve dependence of regeneration, positional identity, senescent cells, and regeneration as an evolutionary variable.

He plays chess as a FIDE and ECF-rated player.

== Personal life ==
He is the uncle of award-winning journalist and author Emma Brockes.

== Works ==
- Brockes JP, Fields KL, Raff MC. A surface antigenic marker for rat Schwann cells. Nature 266, 364-366 (1977).
- Lemke GE, Brockes JP. Identification and purification of glial growth factor. Journal of Neuroscience 4, 75-83 (1984)
- Brockes JP, Kintner CR. Glial Growth Factor and nerve-dependent proliferation in the regeneration blastema of urodele amphibians. Cell 45, 301-306 (1986)
- Tanaka EM, Gann AA, Gates PB, Brockes JP. Newt myotubes re-enter the cell cycle by phosphorylation of the retinoblastoma protein. J. Cell Biol.136, 155-165 (1997).
- Morais da Silva S, Gates PB, Brockes JP. The newt ortholog of CD59 is implicated in proximodistal identity during amphibian limb regeneration. Dev. Cell 3, 547-555 (2002)
- Kanu N, Imokawa Y, Drechsel DN, Williamson RA, Birkett CR, Bostock CJ, Brockes JP.Transfer of scrapie prion infectivity by cell contact in culture.Current Biology 12, 523-530 (2002)
- Kumar A, Godwin JW, Gates PB, Garza-Garcia AA, Brockes JP. Molecular basis for the nerve dependence of limb regeneration in an adult vertebrate.Science 330, 485-490 (2007).
- Yun MH, Davaapil H, Brockes JP. Recurrent turnover of senescent cells during regeneration of a complex structure. eLife May 5, (2015)
- Jeremy P. Brockes, Anoop Kumar, Cristiana P. Velloso, "Regeneration as an evolutionary variable" J Anat. 2001 Jul-Aug; 199(Pt 1–2): 3–11.
- Neuroimmunology, Plenum Press, 1982, ISBN 978-0-306-40955-4.

== Honours and Prizes ==
1985 Scientific Medal, Zoological Society of London.

1989 Elected to Membership of the European Molecular Biology Organisation

1989 Elected to Membership of the Academia Europaea

1994 Elected to Fellowship of the Royal Society

2008 Newcomb Cleveland Prize (joint recipient), AAAS

2022 Inaugural Lifetime Achievement Award, International Society for Regenerative Biology
