= Patheon =

Pharmaceutical company

Patheon by Thermo Fisher Scientific
- Type: Subsidiary
- Industry: Contract Development Manufacturing Organization
- Headquarters: Waltham, Massachusetts, U.S.
- Key people: Marc N. Casper (President & CEO)
- Parent: Thermo Fisher Scientific
- Website: www.patheon.com/us/en/home.html

Patheon is a service brand within Thermo Fisher Scientific's brand portfolio. Contract development and manufacturing organization (CDMO) services offered under the Patheon brand include small molecule API, biologics, viral vectors, cGMP plasmids, formulation, clinical trials, logistics and commercial manufacturing and packaging. In 2017, Patheon was acquired by Thermo Fisher Scientific to form its Pharma Services business.

== History ==
Patheon was founded in Fort Erie, Ontario in 1974 as Custom Pharmaceuticals Ltd. In 1990, it began to expand to US markets. Custom Pharmaceuticals changed its name to Patheon in 1993 and was first publicly traded that year on the Toronto Stock Exchange.

In 2004, Patheon acquired MOVA, a drug manufacturer based in Puerto Rico, US. The deal proved unprofitable, and in 2007, the New York equity firm JLL Partners provided Patheon $150 million to restructure. Two years later, after a failed takeover bid by Lonza Group, JLL Partners bought a controlling interest in the company.

In December 2012, Patheon acquired Banner Pharmacaps, a drug manufacturer specializing in softgels, for $255 million. (Patheon changed the company's name the following year to "Banner Life Sciences"). In a $2.6 billion deal, Patheon merged with the pharmaceutical division of Royal DSM NV in 2014 to become a joint venture after JLL Partners bought a controlling stake in the latter as well, adding significantly to Patheon's European production capacity.

In 2015, Patheon acquired Agere Pharmaceuticals, an Oregon company specializing in drug solubility, and IRIX, a maker of specialist Active Pharmaceutical Ingredients in South Carolina, the latter for $162.78 million.

On August 29, 2017, Thermo Fisher Scientific completed its acquisition of Patheon for $7.2 billion.

== Dosage Forms, Products ==
Patheon does not own any of the licenses of the products it manufactures and is often listed as the manufacturer on packaging, with the product license holder's brand name, product name and corporate identity being used. Clients include such pharmaceutical brands as Merck & Co, Novartis, Takeda and Sanofi Aventis, with biotechnology customers including Amgen and Avanir Pharmaceuticals. As of 2016, Patheon had manufactured or developed more than 800 products.

In 2016, Patheon's manufacturing sites included sites in Canada, the continental US, Puerto Rico, France, the United Kingdom, Italy, Austria, Germany, the Netherlands, Japan, and Australia.

Patheon manufactures products in various dosage forms including oral solids (tablets, capsules) and injectable sterile products (vials, ampoules, pre-filled syringes containing liquids, powders and lyophilisates).
