= PPD, Inc. =

Global contract research organization

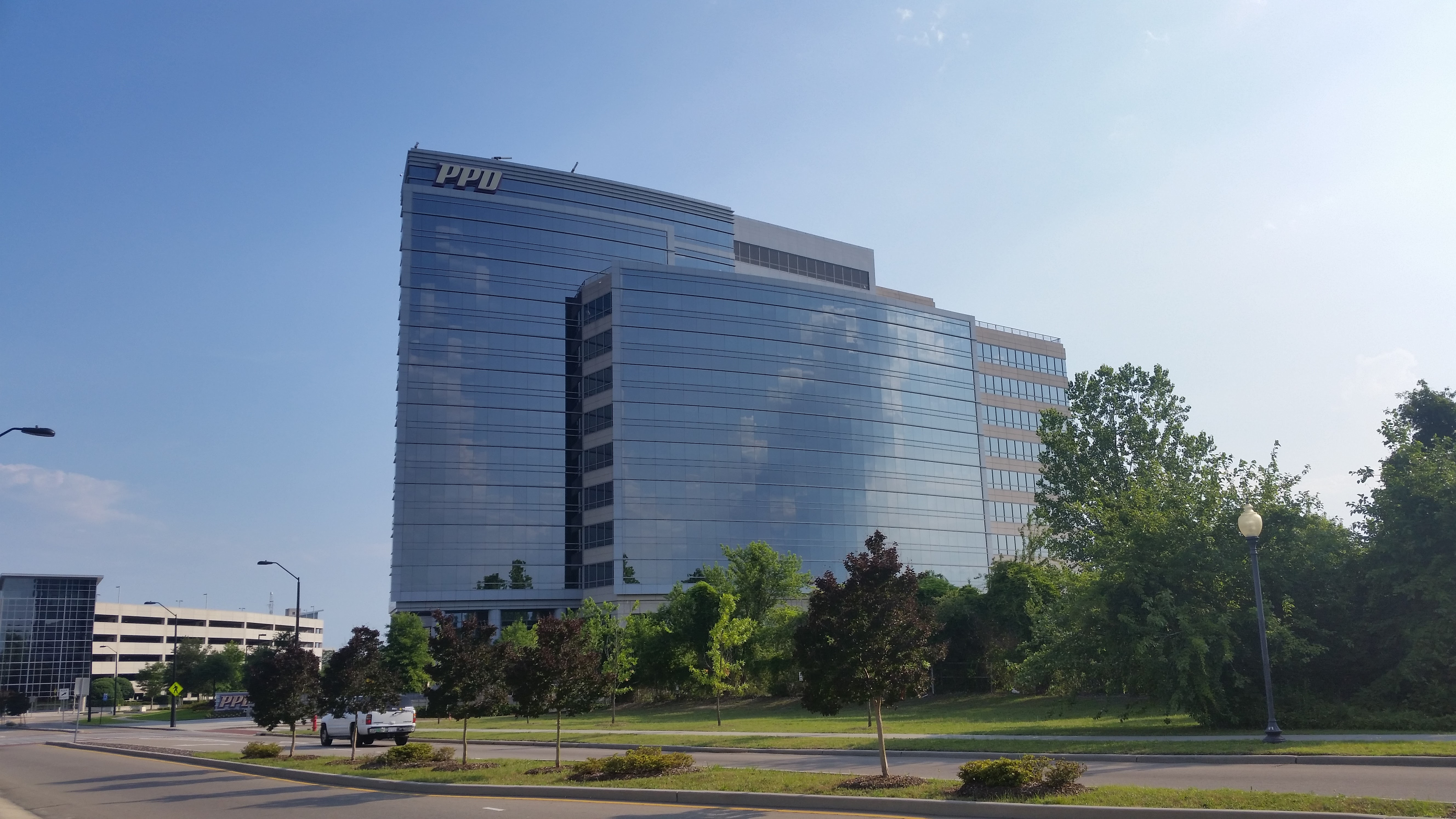
- PPD Headquarters in Wilmington, North Carolina
- Type: Subsidiary
- Industry: Contract research organizations Pharmaceutical; Biotechnology
- Founded: 1985
- Headquarters: Waltham, Massachusetts, United States
- Key people: See Senior Leadership Team page of the PPD Website
- Products: Contract clinical research for pharmaceutical, biotechnology, medical device, academic and government organizations; services include drug development, laboratory and lifecycle management.
- Revenue: ▲$4.7 Billion (2020)
- Number of employees: 40,000+ (2023)
- Parent: Thermo Fisher Scientific
- Website: https://www.ppd.com

Pharmaceutical Product Development (PPD) is a global contract research organization (CRO) providing comprehensive, integrated drug development, laboratory and lifecycle management services. In December 2021, PPD became a wholly owned subsidiary of Thermo Fisher Scientific.

== History ==
PPD was founded by Fred Eshelman, Pharm.D., as a one-person consulting firm in 1985. The following year, he expanded the company's scope to include development services and relocated operations from Maryland to North Carolina.

In January 1989, the company incorporated in North Carolina.

In January 1996, PPD issued its initial public stock offering and began trading on the Nasdaq National Market System under the symbol PPDI.

In October 2005, PPD's board of directors adopted an annual cash dividend policy.

In July 2009, the company promoted Eshelman to executive chairman and names David Grange chief executive officer. In January 2010, the company commemorated the 25th anniversary of its founding. In June the same year, PPD spun off its compound partnering division as a new and independent publicly traded company, Furiex Pharmaceuticals.

A year later, in May 2011, David Grange retired as chief executive officer of PPD. In September, PPD's board of directors named Raymond Hill as PPD's new chief executive officer. In December of that year, the company was acquired by affiliates of The Carlyle Group and affiliates of Hellman & Friedman in an all-cash transaction valued at approximately $3.9 billion.

In May 2012, PPD's board of directors named David Simmons as chairman and CEO.

In August 2013, PPD acquired Acurian.

In December 2014, PPD announced an agreement with SNBL to form a joint venture to provide full range of clinical development services in Japan.

In May 2015, PPD expanded its network of U.S.-based research sites via strategic relationship with Radiant.

In June 2016, PPD expanded its network of global research sites via strategic relationship with Synexus. In September of that year, PPD acquired Evidera.

In April 2017, Hellman & Friedman and affiliates of The Carlyle Group entered into definitive agreements to recapitalize PPD and expand the company's ownership to include two new investors, a subsidiary of the Abu Dhabi Investment Authority and an affiliate of GIC Private Limited, Singapore's sovereign wealth fund.

In July 2018, PPD launched a new site solution. In the same month, Synexus announced U.S.-based registry to power major longitudinal study on brain aging.

In February 2019, PPD made a deal with China's HLT to create data science-driven research solutions. In May of the same year, PPD's Evidera acquired RWE provider Medimix. In September 2019, PPD's Accelerated Enrollment Solutions acquired global site business from Bioclinica.

In February 2020, PPD issued its initial public stock offering and began trading on the Nasdaq Global Select Market under the symbol PPD.

In April 2021, Thermo Fisher Scientific announced plans to acquire PPD for $17.4 billion. The acquisition was complete in December 2021.
