= Peter Moore (chemist) =

American scientist

Peter B. Moore
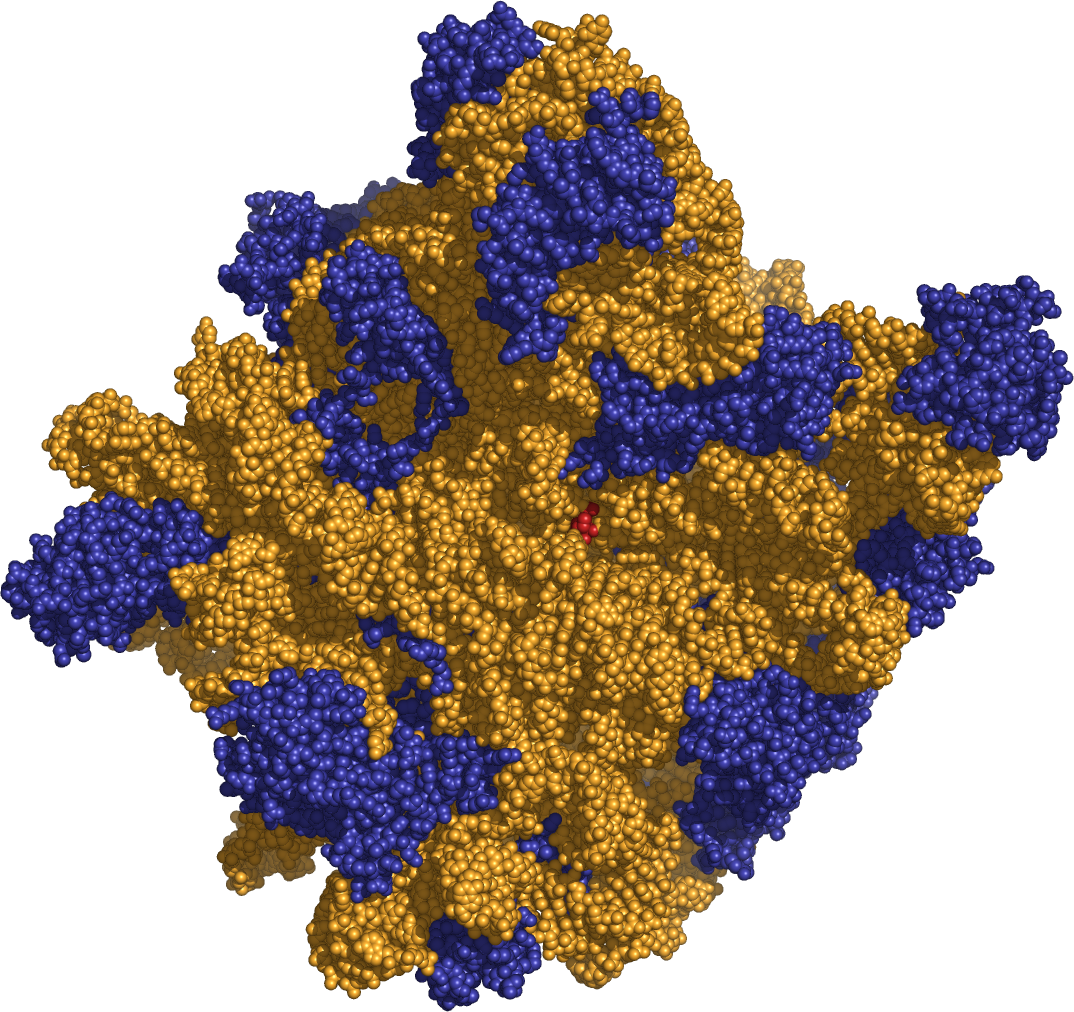
- Atomic Structure of the 50S Subunit
- Born: October 15, 1939 (age 86); Massachusetts, U.S.
- Education: Yale University, Harvard University
- Known for: Ribosome structure
- Awards: Rosenstiel Award recipient
- Scientific career
- Fields: Chemistry
- Workplaces: Yale University
- Doctoral advisor: James D. Watson

Peter B. Moore (born October 15, 1939) is Sterling Professor emeritus of Chemistry, Professor of Molecular Biophysics and Biochemistry at Yale University. He has dedicated his entire career to understanding the structure, function, and mechanism of the ribosome.

Moore was born in Boston, Massachusetts, in 1939 to Laura Bartlett Moore and Francis Daniels Moore. He received his B.S. degree in biophysics from Yale University in 1961, and his Ph.D. in biophysics from Harvard University in 1966, where he worked in the laboratory of James D. Watson. Prior to attending Yale, Moore graduated from Milton Academy in Milton, Massachusetts, where he was elected to the Cum Laude Society. As a postdoctoral fellow and a sabbatical visitor, he has done research at the University of Geneva, Switzerland (with A. Tissieres), at the Medical Research Council Laboratory of Molecular Biology, Cambridge, England (with Hugh E. Huxley), and at the University of Oxford, England.

He is a fellow of the American Association for the Advancement of Science and of the Biophysical Society, and was elected to the National Academy of Sciences in 1997. He is a member of the American Society of Biochemistry and Molecular Biology, Sigma Xi, American Chemical Society, New York Academy of Sciences, RNA Society and the Connecticut Academy of Science and Engineering. He has served on numerous advisory committees for the Department of Energy, Brookhaven National Laboratory, and the National Research Council. He was chairman of the Department of Chemistry at Yale from 1987 to 1990. He is a past Editor of the Biophysical Journal. At Commencement in May 2025, Yale awarded him an honorary Doctor of Science degree.

== Career summary ==
- 1961, B.S. Yale University
- 1966, Ph.D. Harvard University
- 1966–67, Postdoctoral Fellow, Institute de Biologie Moleculaire at University of Geneva in Geneva, Switzerland
- 1967–69, Laboratory of Molecular Biology at the MRC in Cambridge, UK
- 1969 Joined Yale Faculty
- 1979–80, Guggenheim Fellow, University of Oxford, UK
- 1992, American Association for the Advancement of Science Fellow
- 1997, Member of National Academy of Sciences
- 2001, Rosenstiel Award recipient
- 2002, AAAS Newcomb Cleveland Prize recipient
- 2003, American Academy of Arts and Sciences fellow
