= Fisher Scientific =

Former laboratory supply and biotechnology company

- Industry: Scientific tools and reagents
- Founded: 1902
- Defunct: 2006 (company)
- Fate: Merged with Thermo Electron
- Successor: Thermo Fisher Scientific (company)
- Headquarters: Pittsburgh
- Key people: Paul Montrone, last CEO; David T. Della Panta, last president/COO
- Parent: Thermo Fisher Scientific (Note: Lower, Josh (2005). "Fisher Scientific International Inc." Hoover's Online. Retrieved 4 July 2005.) (Note: 2004 Annual Report (Form 10-K). Retrieved 4 July 2005.)
- Website: https://www.fishersci.com/us/en/home.html

Fisher Scientific International, Inc. (NYSE: FSH) was a laboratory supply and biotechnology company that provided products and services to the global scientific research and clinical laboratory markets until its merger with Thermo Electron in 2006, after which it became Thermo Fisher Scientific. The company offered products and services to over 350,000 customers located in approximately 150 countries including pharmaceutical and biotechnology companies, secondary and higher education institutions, hospitals and medical research institutions, and quality control, process control and research and development laboratories.

== History ==
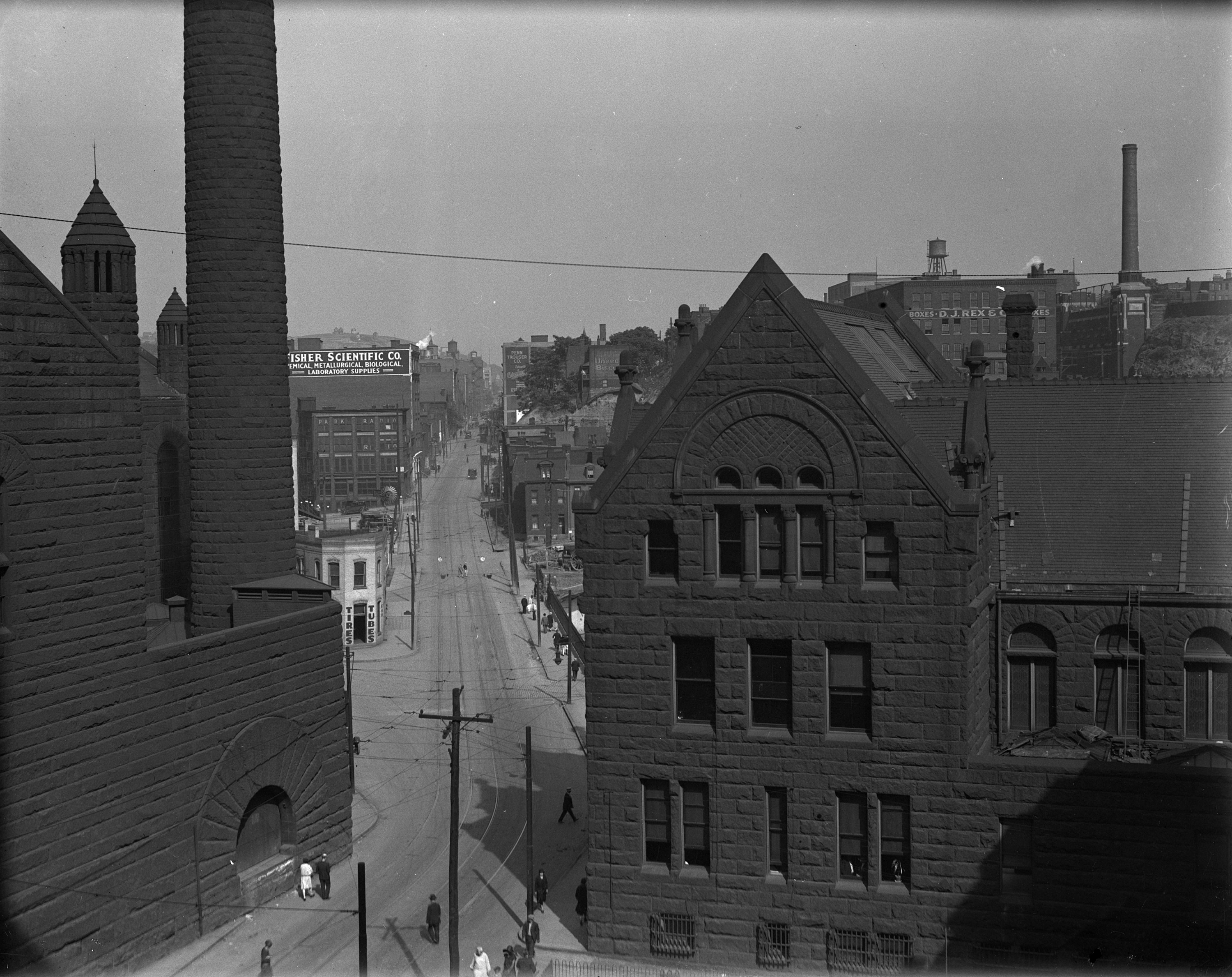
1921 photograph of Pittsburgh with Fisher Scientific sign on top of building

The company was founded in Pittsburgh, Pennsylvania, in 1902 by Chester Garfield Fisher (1881–1965), originally called the "Scientific Materials Co.". After obtaining his degree in engineering at Western University of Pennsylvania (now University of Pittsburgh), C.G. Fisher purchased the stockroom of the Pittsburgh Testing Laboratory. Fisher became a supplier of lab equipment and reagents for the area's industrial research. Early products included microscopes, burets, pipettes, litmus, balances, colorimeters, dissecting kits, and anatomical models. The first catalog, the 400 page Scientific Materials Co. Catalog of Laboratory Apparatus & Supplies, was published in 1904.

Fisher established an R&D lab at his company in 1915. Edwin Fisher, Chester's brother, developed the Meker-Fisher burner in 1921, an advancement on the design of the Bunsen burner. The company manufactured an electric-combustion furnace and combustion train for analyzing carbon levels in steel, and an electrically heated and thermostatically controlled bacteriological incubator.

In 1925, the company purchased Montreal-based Scientific Supplies, Ltd. The same year, the company was renamed Fisher Scientific. In 1940, Fisher Scientific acquired the New York supply company Eimer & Amend, which was founded in 1851 by Bernard G. Amend.

Aiken Fisher, Chester's oldest son, became president of the company in 1949. In 1955, Fisher established a chemical manufacturing facility in Fair Lawn, New Jersey. In 1957, the company purchased the New York–based medical apparatus supply company E. Machlett & Sons. In 1959 the company opened an instrument and supplies facility in Indiana, Pennsylvania.

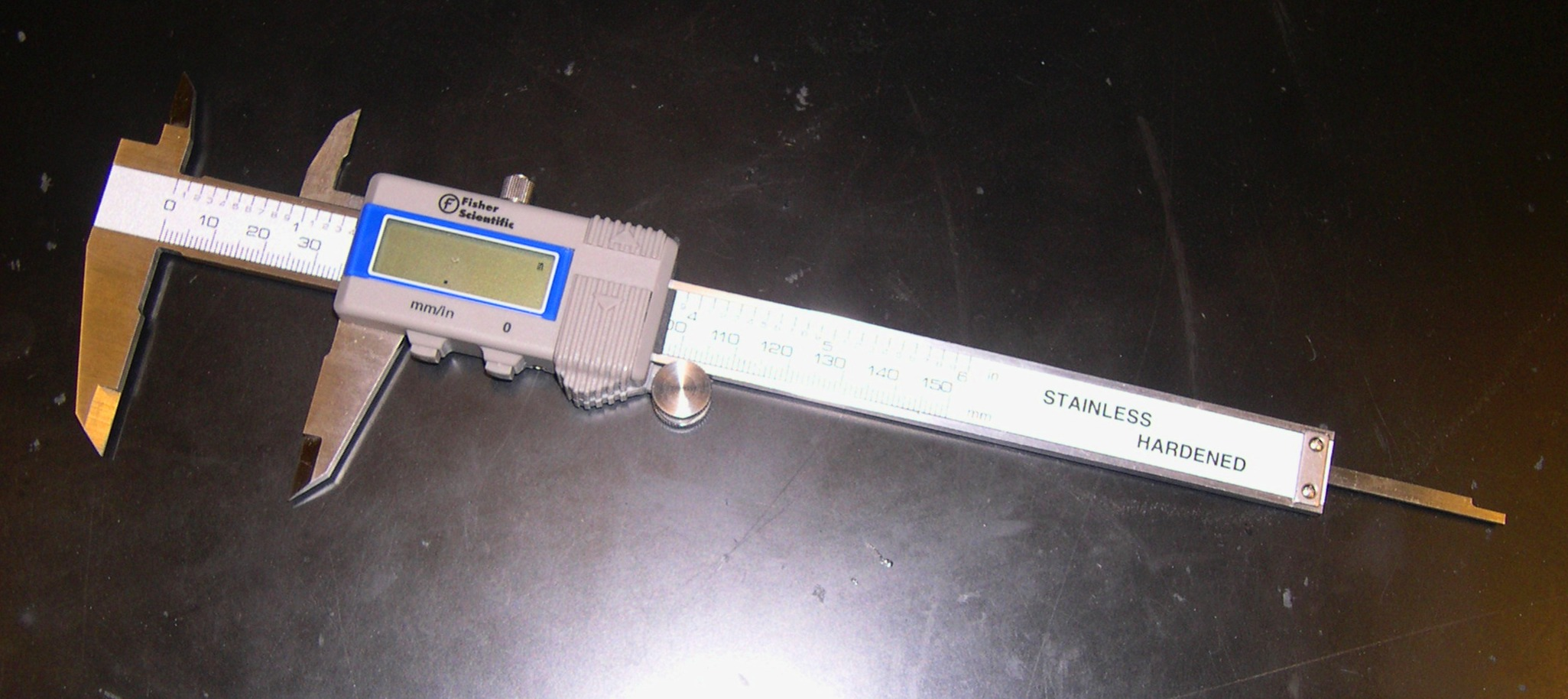
Fisher brand caliper.

Chester Fisher died in 1965 at age 84. His sons maintained leadership of the company, with Aiken becoming Chairman and Benjamin becoming president. The youngest son, James Fisher, had the title Senior Vice President.

Fisher Scientific Company issued its first public stock in 1965, and that year the company had $58 million in sales and close to a million customer transactions. In 1968 Fisher shares were listed on the New York Stock Exchange.

In 1965 the company introduced the Differential Thermalyzer, a differential thermal analysis instrument. It acquired Pfeiffer Glass, Inc. in 1966, a manufacturer of high accuracy volumetric pipettes. The company released the Photometric Titralyzer that year, and a Hem-alyzer in 1968. In 1968, it purchased Massachusetts-based Jarrell-Ash Company, a producer of optical instrumentation, particularly for emission and atomic absorption spectroscopy. It acquired Chicago-based Stansi Scientific Company in 1967, expanding into educational science supplies. In 1976, Fisher Scientific established an Instrument Service Division.

Fisher was acquired by Morristown, New Jersey–based Allied Corporation in 1981 for $330 million. At this time Benjamin R. Fisher was Chairman of the company, having gained the position in 1975 upon Aiken's retirement. Operating as a subsidiary of Allied Corporation (and later AlliedSignal Inc., and The Henley Group), Fisher established a Biotechnology Division in 1985.

In 1991, The Henley Group sold a majority interest in Fisher through a public stock offering. The public entity was called Fisher Scientific International Inc., and based in Hampton, New Hampshire. Fisher Scientific Company remained in Pittsburgh as an operating subsidiary. In 1992, Fisher facilities were ISO-9000 certified.

In the 1990s, Fisher, with partner Intertech Corporation of Atkinson, New Hampshire, set up a pharmaceutical testing and certification lab in Moscow, Russia, to serve with the Russian Federation's Ministry of Health and Medical Industry needs. Fisher acquired Eastman Kodak Company's organic-chemicals business and Janssen Chimica, forming Acros Organics.

In August 2004, the company merged with Apogent Technologies Inc., a company engaged primarily in the manufacture and sale of laboratory products in the United States and other countries.

In May 2006, Fisher Scientific and Thermo Electron announced that they would merge in a tax-free, stock-for-stock exchange. The merger closed on November 9, 2006, and the merged company is now called Thermo Fisher Scientific. The merger was valued at $12.8 billion.

== See also ==
- Biochemistry
- Lancaster Laboratories
- Pharmaceutical companies
- Pharmaceutical chemistry
- History of biochemistry
