= Reuben Leon Kahn =

American immunologist (1887–1979)

- Born: July 26, 1887; Kovno, Russian Empire
- Died: July 22, 1979 (aged 91); Miami
- Citizenship: United States
- Education: New York University doctor of science in bacteriology (1916), Yale University masters degree in physiological chemistry (1913), Valparaiso University bachelors degree in medicine (1909) and honorary doctorate (1944)
- Known for: test for syphilis
- Awards: Newcomb Cleveland Prize (1933)
- Scientific career
- Fields: immunology, especially serology

Reuben Leon Kahn (July 26, 1887 in Kovno, Russian Empire – July 22, 1979 in Miami) was an American immunologist.

He is best known for his investigations of blood reactions, like the Kahn test, an efficient test for syphilis.
