= Alfa Aesar =

Former medical products company

- Industry: Basic materials
- Defunct: 2021
- Fate: Acquired by Thermo Fisher Scientific and products rebranded to Thermo Scientific
- Headquarters: Ward Hill, Massachusetts, U.S.
- Products: Specialty chemicals
- Owner: Thermo Fisher Scientific
- Website: www.alfa.com

Alfa Aesar was a supplier of reagents and materials for use in research and development, and analysis. The company had facilities in a variety of countries and manufactured many of the chemicals they sold. The company was bought by Thermo Fisher Scientific in 2015, having previously existed as part of the Johnson Matthey Fine Chemicals & Catalysts Division. In 2021, Alfa Aesar products were rebranded under the Thermo Scientific brand name.

== History ==
Alfa Aesar was formed from a series of company mergers:

- Alfa Inorganics was founded in 1962 by Alfred Bader, in a 50:50 venture between Aldrich Chemicals and Metal Hydrides Inc. The purpose was to provide a source of inorganic research chemicals to sit alongside the organic chemicals of Bader's other company: Aldrich Chemicals. It was created to market inorganics, organometallics, and others such as organoboron and organoarsenic reagents. Following the amalgamation of Aldrich and the Sigma Chemical Co, the joint venture was terminated with Alfa reverting to Metal Hydrides ownership (later Ventron, later again Thiokol). In the USA the business was branded as Alfa, and sold only inorganics. In Europe, the business was branded as Alfa-Ventron (to distinguish it from the UK company Alfa Chemicals) and also later sold a limited range of organic chemicals sourced from Lancaster Synthesis. The European sales office was in Karlsruhe, Germany. The USA and European operations used different (though similar) catalogues, with completely different product number sequences and appear to have been run with a high degree of independence from each other. Thiokol eventually tired of the non-mainstream business and sold it to Aesar, who closed the USA site and relocated the business to the Aesar location.
- Johnson Matthey Research Chemicals. Johnson-Matthey had two distinct research chemical catalogues, one of high purity inorganic chemicals and metals, the other a (short-lived) range of inorganic reagents, solvents and acids. This was operated from their facility at Royston, Hertfordshire U.K. Royston had manufacturing and machining equipment for high purity metal foils, powders, ribbons and salts.
- Aesar. This was Johnson Matthey's part-owned USA distribution agent for their range of high purity inorganics. Aesar had no manufacturing or bottling facilities, being simply a distribution centre. Following the takeover of Alfa, the combined business was rebranded Alfa-Aesar, rationalised on the Aesar location at Ward Hill, and Johnson-Matthey assumed full ownership. This grew in importance to lead the Johnson Matthey research chemical interests.
- Lancaster Synthesis, initially based in Lancaster and then Morecambe, Lancashire UK. This business was founded by Eric Wildsmith and Wilf Maughan and specialised in the manufacture and supply of organic research chemicals. The business was sold to MTM PLC for £20,000,000 in 1989, following which Maughan retired and Wildsmith was eventually ousted as managing director by the Executive Chairman of MTM : Richard Lines. MTM subsequently went bankrupt, Lines and the MTM Financial Director, Tom Baxter were jailed for fraud, and Lancaster Synthesis (by then rebranded MTM Research Chemicals) was sold to BTP PLC in 1993 - who reverted the name to Lancaster Synthesis. BTP in turn was later sold to Clariant, who had no idea what to do with a catalogue company - and eventually agreed a sale to Johnson Matthey for £14,000,000. Unfortunately a few weeks before the sale was due to complete, an unexplained major fire destroyed the scale-up plant and the majority of the bulk stock. This has echoes of another destructive fire on the eve of the MTM takeover, which totally destroyed a manufacturing laboratory. The purchase price was subsequently revised to £2,000,000 following further negotiations after the fire, and the purchase was completed in October 2004. The Lancaster Synthesis sites have now all closed, with all UK operations moved to the newer Avocado facilities at Heysham. During the period of MTM ownership, a series of other companies were acquired and brought under notional control: Loba Feinchemie (Fischamend, Austria), Farchan Laboratories (Gainesville, Florida) Monomer Polymer & Dajac Labs (USA). These were all sold back to their previous owners or local management following the MTM collapse as they required too high a management input from the UK, and had never been properly integrated. Not long after Farchan was returned to local management it also was destroyed in a fire, subsequently relocating to Columbus, OH close to the location of its founding, where its initial technology had been based on research into high performance aviation fuels during WWII by Henry Channon. During the period of MTM ownership a short-lived distribution agreement existed for Farmitalia-Carlo Erba to distribute Lancaster Synthesis products through a Carlo Erba rebranded version of the LS catalogue. However this venture was a failure and only lasted for one catalogue edition: the Italians proved unable to commit the required marketing resources to the project.
- Fairfield Chemicals, Blythewood, South Carolina. This was a small-scale manufacturing plant near Columbia S.C. which specialised in hazardous chemistry, often involving fluorine and phosgene. It was acquired by MTM from its founder, Hiram S. Allen, as a USA manufacturing plant for Lancaster Synthesis, and was the one MTM Research Chemical acquisition that was properly integrated and managed. Like many other similar small chemical sites in that part of South Carolina, it was subject to intense local environmental concerns and pressures, driving Clariant to eventually close the site. However the intellectual property, stock and customers were transferred to Lancaster Synthesis prior to closure.
- Avocado Research Chemicals, based in Heysham, Lancashire, UK, specializing in organic chemicals. This was Eric Wildsmith's second foray into the research chemical business. Originally based in Lancaster, it quickly grew, moving to a purpose built location at Heysham following a serious fire at its second location on Caton Road, Lancaster. It was subsequently sold to Johnson-Matthey for £25,000,000 and integrated into Alfa-Aesar, becoming their main organic production plant.

Both Lancaster Synthesis and Avocado had close trading links to Alfa at various times prior to the takeover: the organic products sold in Germany through the Alfa-Ventron catalogue were sourced from Lancaster, while Avocado products were distributed both in the US and Germany by the combined Alfa-Aesar. During the late 1970s / early 1980s, Lancaster Synthesis was the primary UK distribution agent for the USA Alfa range, taking this business over after it was relinquished by Aldrich UK. However this relationship was undermined when Alfa-Ventron independently opened its own short-lived sales unit in the Thiokol-Morton offices in Coventry.

On June 25, 2015, Johnson Matthey agreed to sell Alfa Aesar for an amount of £256 million to Thermo Fisher Scientific. Johnson Matthey cited that "This is a further step in delivering our strategy to focus on areas where we can apply our expertise in complex chemistry". Thermo Fisher Scientific cited that "The acquisition of Alfa Aesar enhances our existing portfolio of chemicals, solvents and reagents to support virtually every laboratory application – from research, to drug discovery and development, to production, In addition, customers will benefit from greater access to these products through our extensive global commercial reach.". The acquirement was completed at the end of 2015. Johnson Matthey and Thermo Fisher Scientific both made statements, as well as Alfa Aesar.

Alongside this, Thermo-Fisher also purchased the chemical research catalogue businesses of

- Fisons Scientific of Loughborough, UK. This company had marketed a range of solvents and analytic reagents alongside a range of scientific equipment.
- Acros Organics of Geel, Belgium. Originally set up as Aldrich-Europe, a division of Janssen Chimica as European distributor for Aldrich in Europe. This arrangement was terminated following the amalgamation of Aldrich and Sigma Chemicals - with Janssen losing the right to use the Aldrich name. Aldrich-Europe was renamed Acros Organics and continued in business but became non-core to Janssen (and its parent Johnson & Johnson) and was eventually disposed of to Thermo-Fisher
- Maybridge Chemicals of Tintagel, Cornwall, UK. Setup by Dr Roden Bridgwater as a supplier of a wide range of screening molecules for drug discovery research

== Manufacturing ==
The main manufacturing organic chemical facility is located at Heysham, Lancashire, UK. 54.0383°N 2.9071°W. This has been supplemented by a bulk manufacturing site at Yantai, China.

== Product lines ==
The company supplies a large variety of chemicals for various disciplines including:

- Organic chemistry
- Inorganic chemistry
- Analytical chemistry
- Chromatography
- Semiconductor manufacturing
- Pure chemical elements
- Biochemistry and molecular biology
- Large scale chemicals & contract manufacturing

Alfa Aesar is a major supplier in the research and fine chemicals market offering over 30,000 products - many of which are rare compounds, which are unique to a major catalogue supplier. Alfa Aesar provides materials for drug discovery, materials science and all the essential building blocks for organic synthesis.
