= Novasep =

Pharmaceutical industry supplier

- Industry: Pharmaceutical supplier
- Founded: c. 1995
- Founder: Michel Spagnol
- Headquarters: Lyon, France
- Revenue: EUR 271 million (2016)
- Number of employees: 1200 (2017)
- Website: www.novasep.com

Novasep, based in Lyon (France), is a group of companies involved in pharmaceutical and biopharmaceutical technologies.

== History ==
The company emerged as a start-up founded by Roger-Marc Nicoud c. 1995, producing pharmaceuticals, biopharmaceuticals, and purification technologies for food markets.

Novasep was privately owned until 2005 before it was sold to the American Rockwood group. In 2005, the major investments were made with Rockwood as an investment partner. As of 2007, private equity investors Gilde Buy-Out Partners and Banexi Capital Partenaires owned 72% of Groupe Novasep, with management's share at 28%. In 2011, the company's debts of €450 million had to be restructured; this brought the company's capital through a haircut and debt stake swap into the hands of the American investors Tennenbaum, Silver Point and Pimco. The founder subsequently left the company and new management was appointed; the headquarters was moved from Pompey in Lorraine to Lyon.

Novasep's Belgium viral vector manufacturing division, Henogen, was sold to Thermo Fisher for €725 million in January 2021. Later that month it was announced by AstraZeneca that production difficulties at the Belgium plant meant supplies of the Oxford–AstraZeneca COVID-19 vaccine to the European Union would be less than the 80m doses expected be supplied to March 2021.
