= Shiv I.S. Grewal =

Cancer researcher

- Born: 1965 (age 60–61)
- Education: University of Cambridge
- Scientific career
- Workplaces: National Cancer Institute

Shiv I.S. Grewal is an American scientist who is a distinguished investigator and laboratory chief at Center for Cancer Research, National Cancer Institute, National Institutes of Health, who studies the epigenetic control of higher-order chromatin assembly. His scientific career began at the University of Cambridge, where he held the prestigious Cambridge-Nehru scholarship and received Ph.D. in 1992. Then he joined National Cancer Institute as a postdoctoral fellow and found that the silenced states of gene expression can be propagated as epigenetic states. He continued to pursue his interests in the areas of epigenetic control of gene expression and development, joining Cold Spring Harbor Laboratory as an assistant professor in 1998, where he was promoted to associate professor in 2002. In 2003, he assumed a position of Senior Investigator at the Laboratory of Molecular Cell Biology, National Cancer Institute, where he was appointed distinguished investigator and laboratory chief in 2011.

Grewal’s works to understand the epigenetic control of higher-order chromatin assembly have addressed important questions on mechanisms for dynamic regulation of chromosome structure that govern diverse cellular processes including stable inheritance of gene expression, proper regulation of developmental states, and preserving genomic integrity, providing broad implications for human biology and disease including cancer. Work by Grewal showing a connection between RNAi and heterochromatin formation was selected 'Breakthrough of the Year' by Science magazine. Three papers from Grewal laboratory are cited as “Milestones” for historic discoveries over the past 50 years by Nature.

Grewal has received numerous awards including Demerec-Kaufmann award in developmental biology, the 1999 Ellison Medical Foundation new scholar award, the Newcomb Cleveland prize by the American Association for Advancement of Science, NIH Directors's award and the NIH MERIT award. In 2009, he was ranked as one of the most cited scientists in the field of epigenetics. In 2014, he was elected to the National Academy of Sciences and also the American Academy of Arts and Sciences.

In 2017, the Indian National Science Academy elected Grewal as a Foreign Fellow of the Academy.
