= USB Corporation =

Medical device company

- Industry: research support
- Founded: 1980s
- Successor: Affymetrix
- Headquarters: Cleveland, OH, USA
- Products: life science
- Website: www.usbweb.com

USB Corporation offers life science products for use in basic research, drug discovery and molecular diagnostics. The company history reaches back to the 1980s, as United States Biochemical, known for Sequenase DNA Polymerase, a genetically modified enzyme used to develop the first easy-to-use DNA sequencing products. Today, USB focuses on molecular biology and biochemical products for DNA amplification (PCR), purification, cloning, protein studies and RNA analysis.

USB was acquired by Affymetrix at the start of 2008.
