= Genevac =

Company

Genevac Ltd is a company which was founded in 1990 by Michael Cole. It used to specialize in the manufacture of vacuum pumps and centrifugal evaporators, but has since directed its attention to equipment designed for combinatorial chemistry. Following a series of mergers, it is currently a subsidiary of SP Industries.
