= Centrifugal evaporator =

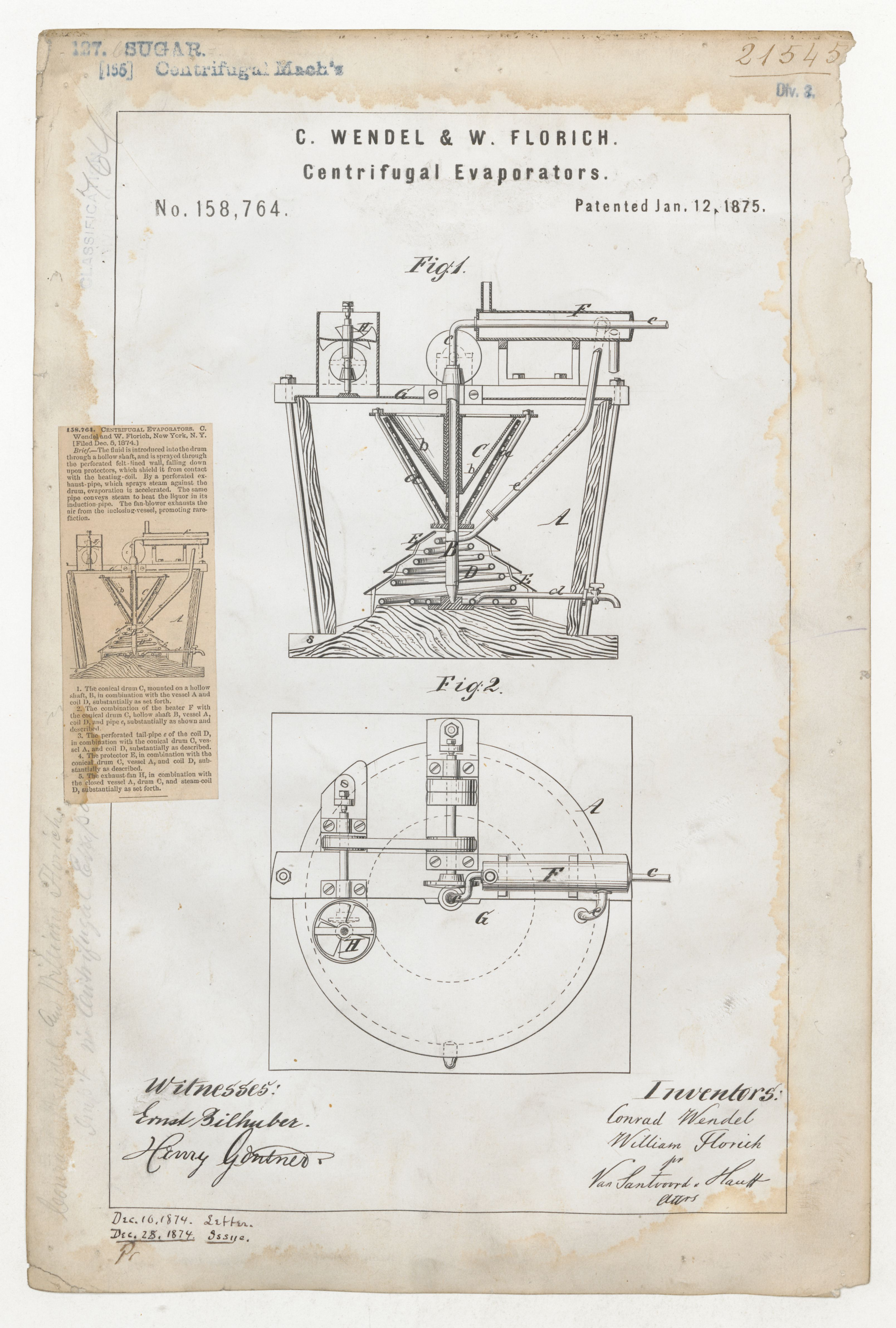
Centrifugal evaporator patent from 1875

A centrifugal evaporator is a device used in chemical and biochemical laboratories for the efficient and gentle evaporation of solvents from many samples at the same time, and samples contained in microtitre plates. If only one sample required evaporation then a rotary evaporator is most often used. The most advanced modern centrifugal evaporators not only concentrate many samples at the same time, they eliminate solvent bumping and can handle solvents with boiling points of up to 220 °C. This is more than adequate for the modern high throughput laboratory.

== History ==
The centrifugal evaporator dates from the second half of the 1800s. Patent US158764 was granted in 1875 to Conrad Wendel and William Florich for an improvement in centrifugal evaporators.

== Design ==
A centrifugal evaporator often comprises a vacuum pump connected to a centrifuge chamber in which the samples are placed. Many systems also have a cold trap or solvent condenser placed in line between the vacuum pump and the centrifuge chamber to collect the evaporated solvents. The most efficient systems also have a cold trap on the pump exhaust. There are many further developments available from manufacturers to speed up the process, and to provide protection for delicate samples.

== Mechanism ==
The system works by lowering the pressure in the centrifuge system - as the pressure drops so does the boiling point of the solvent(s) in the system. When the pressure is sufficiently low that the boiling points of the solvents are below the temperature of the sample holder, then they will boil. This enables solvent to be rapidly removed while the samples themselves are not heated to damaging temperatures. High performance systems can remove very high boiling solvents such as dimethyl sulfoxide (DMSO) or N-methyl-2-pyrrolidone (NMP) while keeping sample temperatures below 40 °C at all times.

The centrifugal force generated by spinning the centrifuge rotor creates a pressure gradient within the solvent contained in the tubes or vials, this means that the samples boil from the top down, helping to prevent "bumping". The most advanced systems apply the vacuum slowly and run the rotor at speeds of 500 x gravity - this system is proven to prevent bumping and was patented by Genevac in the late 1990s.
