= Affymetrix =

American biotech company

Affymetrix, Inc.
- Type: Subsidiary
- Industry: Biotechnology
- Founded: 1992
- Headquarters: Santa Clara, California, U.S.
- Number of locations: 11
- Key people: Stephen Fodor, Frank Witney (CEO)
- Revenue: ▲US$327 Million (FY 2009)
- Operating income: ▼US$-30.6 Million (FY 2009)
- Net income: ▼US$-23.9 Million (FY 2009)
- Total assets: ▼US$612 Million (FY 2009)
- Total equity: ▼US$288 Million (FY 2009)
- Number of employees: 1,141
- Parent: Thermo Fisher Scientific
- Website: https://www.thermofisher.com/us/en/home/life-science/microarray-analysis.html

Affymetrix is now Applied Biosystems, a brand of DNA microarray products sold by Thermo Fisher Scientific that originated with an American biotechnology research and development and manufacturing company of the same name. The Santa Clara, California-based Affymetrix, Inc. now a part of Thermo Fisher Scientific was co-founded by Alex Zaffaroni and Stephen Fodor. Stephen Fodor and his group, based on their earlier development of methods to fabricate DNA microarrays using semiconductor manufacturing techniques.

In 1994, the company's first product under the "GeneChip" Affymetrix trademark, an HIV genotyping chip was introduced, and the company went public in 1996.

After incorporation, Affymetrix grew in part by acquiring technologies from other companies, including Genetic MicroSystems (slide-based Microarrays and scanners) and Neomorphic (for bioinformatics) in 2000, ParAllele Bioscience (custom SNP genotyping), USB/Anatrace (biochemical reagents) in 2008, Panomics (low to mid-plex applications) in 2008, and eBioscience (flow cytometry) in 2012. Affymetrix spun off Perlegen Sciences in 2000, as a discrete business focusing on wafer-scale genomics to characterize population-variance of genomic markers.

In January 2014, the Food and Drug Administration approved Affymetrix's postnatal blood test, CytoScan Dx Assay, looking at whole-genome correlates of congenital abnormalities and other causes of childhood developmental delay.

On January 8, 2016, Thermo Fisher Scientific announced its acquisition of Affymetrix for approximately $1.3 billion, which closed on March 31, 2016.

== History ==
Affymetrix, Inc. was spun-off from Affymax Research Institute by Alex Zaffaroni in 1993, and was eventually based in Santa Clara, California, United States. It began as a unit in Affymax N.V. in 1991 under Fodor and his group. In the late 1980s, that group had developed methods for fabricating DNA microarrays, under the "GeneChip" Affymetrix trademark, using semiconductor manufacturing techniques. The company's first product, an HIV genotyping GeneChip, was introduced in 1994 and the company went public in 1996.

== Acquisitions ==
Prior to its acquisition by Thermo Fisher, and its becoming a line of its products, Affymetrix, Inc. had acquired the technologies of a number of companies. It acquired Genetic MicroSystems for slide-based microarrays and scanners and Neomorphic for bioinformatics, both in 2000, ParAllele Bioscience for custom SNP genotyping, USB/Anatrace for biochemical reagents in 2008, eBioscience for flow cytometry in 2012, and Panomics in 2008 and True Materials to expand its offering of low to mid-plex applications. In 2000, Perlegen Sciences spun out from Affymetrix to focus on wafer-scale genomics for massive data creation and collection required for characterizing population variance of genomic markers and expression for the drug discovery process.

== FDA test approval ==
In January 2014, the Food and Drug Administration cleared a first-of-a-kind whole-genome postnatal blood test that can aid physicians in identifying the underlying genetic cause of developmental delay, intellectual disability, congenital anomalies, or dysmorphic features in children, where it was noted that "[a]bout 2 to 3 percent of U.S. children have some sort of intellectual disability, according to the National Institutes of Health." The test, known as CytoScan Dx Assay, was designed to diagnose these disabilities earlier to expedite appropriate care and support.
